= Gold holdings =

Quantities of gold held as a store of value

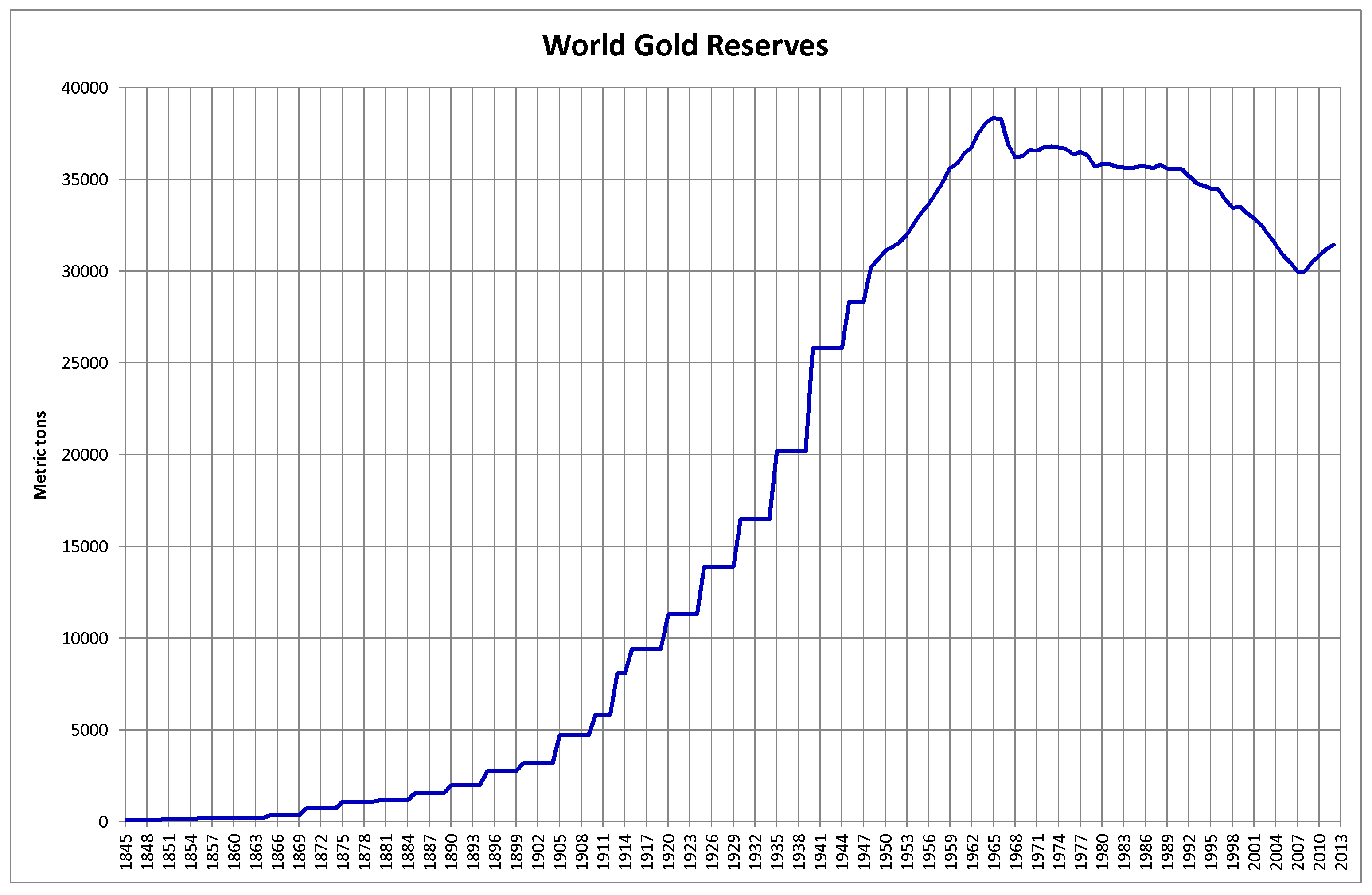
World's gold from 1845 to 2013, in tonnes (metric tons in the U.S.)

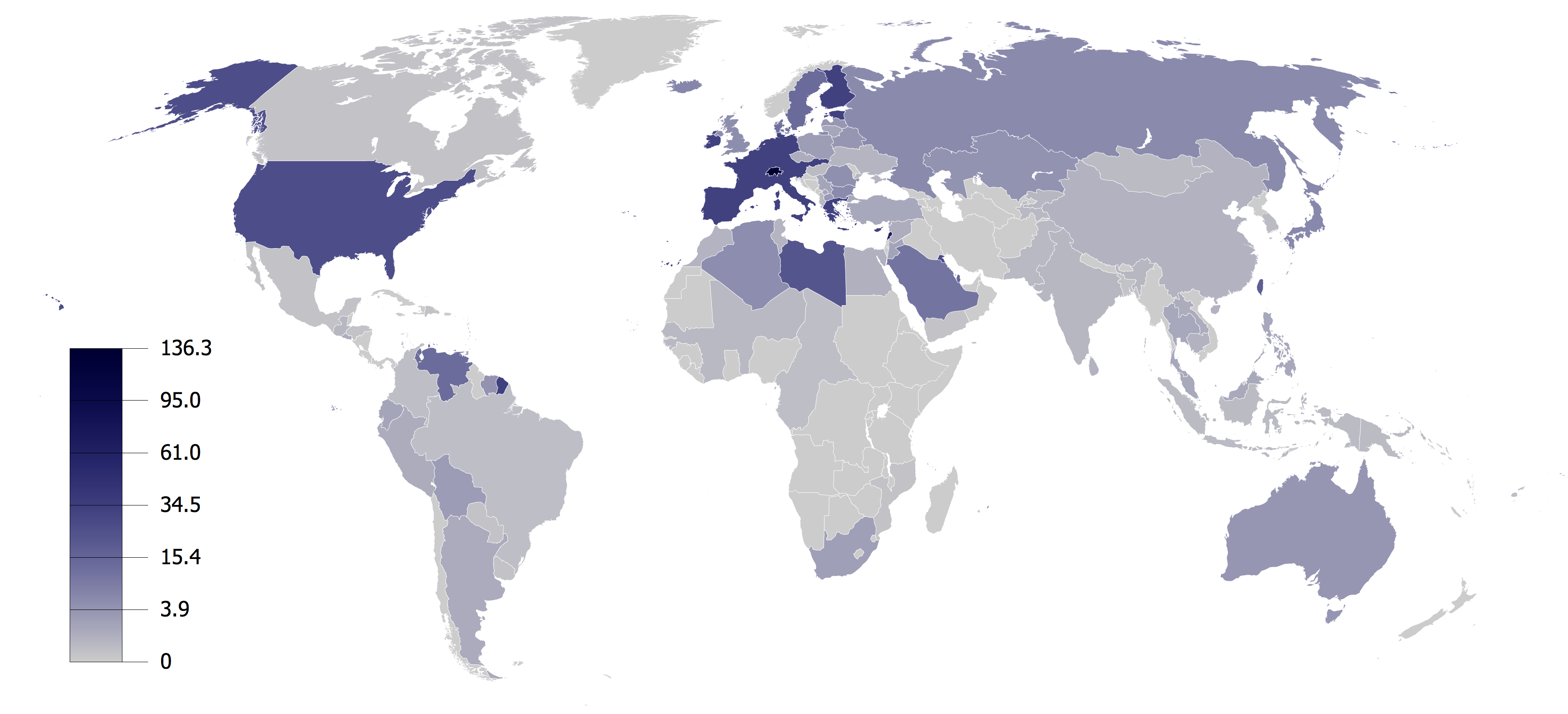
World's gold holdings per capita, in grams

Gold holdings are the quantities of gold held by individuals, private corporations, or public entities as a store of value, an investment vehicle, or perceived as protection against hyperinflation and against financial and/or political upheavals.

During the 19th and early 20th-century eras of the gold standard, national governments undertook an obligation to redeem the national currency for a certain amount of gold. In such times, the nation's central bank used its reserves to meet that obligation, backing some or all of the currency in issue with the metal it held.

The World Gold Council estimates that all the gold ever mined, and that is accounted for, totals 187,200 tonnes, as of 2017 but other independent estimates vary by as much as 20%. At a price of US$1,250 per troy ounce, marked on 25 December 2025, one tonne of gold has a value of approximately US$144 million. The total value of all gold ever mined, and that is accounted for, would exceed US$27 trillion at that valuation, using WGC's 2017 estimates. (Note: Gold, silver, and other precious metals and gems are weighed by the troy ounce. There would be 24,000 troy ounces to 1 imperial ton of weight. One tonne is equal to approximately 32,150.75 troy ounces.)

== IMF holdings ==
Since early 2011, the gold holdings of the IMF have been constant at 90.5 million troy ounces (2,814.1 metric tons).

== National holdings ==
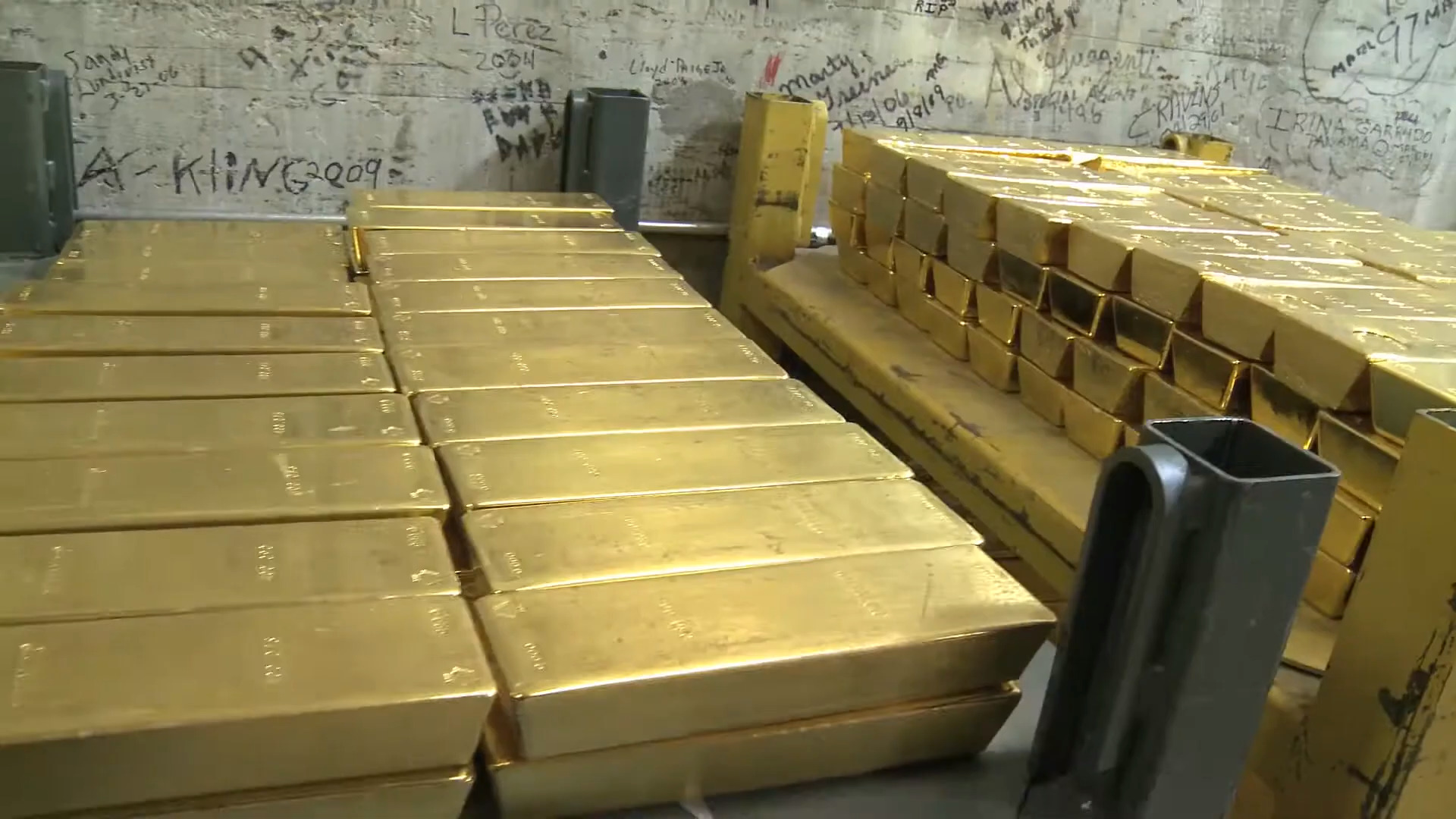
Gold bars at the West Point Mint in the United States

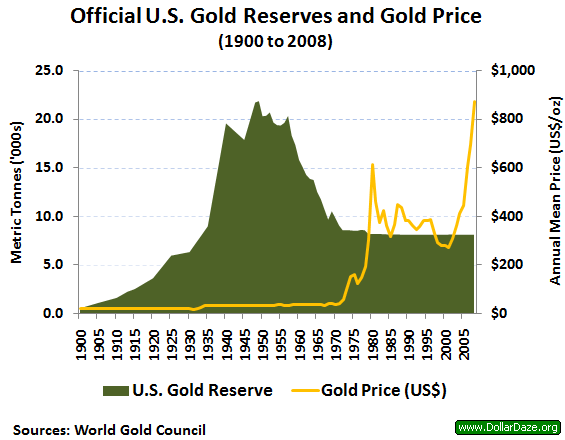
Official U.S. gold holdings since 1900

The IMF regularly maintains statistics of national assets as reported by various countries. This data is used by the World Gold Council to periodically rank and report the gold holdings of countries and official organizations.

On 17 July 2015, China disclosed its official gold holdings for the first time in six years and announced that increased by about 57 percent, from 1,054 to 1,658 metric tons.

The gold listed for each of the countries in the table may not be physically stored in the country listed, as central banks generally do not allow independent audits of their reserves.

Top 50 UN countries according to World Gold Council's latest rankings (as of 3 September 2026)
Rank	Country/Organization	Gold holdings (in metric tons)	Gold's share of forex reserves
1	United States	8,133.4	81.4%
2	Germany	3,350.3	84.0%
—	International Monetary Fund	2,814.0	— (Note: BIS and IMF balance sheets do not allow this percentage to be calculated.)
3	Italy	2,451.8	80.6%
4	France	2,437.0	81.8%
5	China	2,346.4	8.0%
6	Russia	2,283.0	40.6%
7	Switzerland	1,039.9	12.3%
8	India	880.5	16.7%
9	Japan	845.9	8.5%
10	Poland	632.4	27.8%
11	Netherlands	612.5	74.2%
12	Turkey	530.6	56.3%
—	European Central Bank	508.4	56.2%
13	Uzbekistan	431.7	87.4%
—	Taiwan	423.9	%
14	Portugal	382.7	79.9%
15	Kazakhstan	368.3	76.9%
16	Saudi Arabia	323.1	10.0%
17	United Kingdom	310.3	18.6%
18	Lebanon	286.8	82.4%
19	Spain	281.6	33.8%
20	Austria	280.0	71.3%
21	Thailand	234.5	10.8%
22	Belgium	227.4	54.9%
23	Azerbaijan	200.0	38.2%
24	Singapore	203.7	5.9%
25	Iraq	174.6	27.1%
26	Algeria	173.5	33.6%
27	Brazil	172.4	6.0%
28	Libya	146.6	20.4%
29	Philippines	133.5	16.4%
30	Egypt	129.6	32.0%
31	Sweden	125.7	22.2%
32	South Africa	125.5	21.9%
33	Mexico	120.1	5.7%
34	Qatar	116.1	26.7%
35	Greece	114.7	69.5%
36	Hungary	110.0	20.7%
37	South Korea	104.4	3.1%
38	Romania	103.6	15.6%
—	Bank for International Settlements	102.0 (Note: Excluding any gold held in connection with swap operations, under which the bank exchanges currencies for physical gold. The bank has an obligation to return this gold at the end of the contract.)	—
39	Indonesia	87.0	7.7%
40	Czech Republic	82.4	5.9%
41	Australia	79.8	15.2%
42	Kuwait	78.9	22.2%
43	Jordan	78.7	37.8%
44	United Arab Emirates	74.5	3.7%
45	Denmark	66.5	6.9%
46	Pakistan	64.8	29.8%
47	Argentina	61.7	17.8%
48	Cambodia	57.3	29.4%
49	Serbia	54.5	20.9%
50	Belarus	53.8	49.3%
—	World	36,535.4 (Note: World total as calculated by the IMF. This will not equal the total for the countries in the table as ‘World total’ will include data for countries beyond the top 100 and for countries that do not publish their reserves. World total also captures BIS holdings inclusive of swap operations.)	29.2%
—	Euro area (including the ECB)	10,808.3	74.2%

- Notes

== Private holdings ==
Rank	Name	Type	Gold holdings (in tonnes)
1	India	Private	44,600
2	China	Private	31,000
3	SPDR Gold Shares	ETF	1,167
4	iShares Gold Trust	ETF	523.0
5	COMEX Gold Trust	ETF	440.0
6	ETF Securities Gold Funds	ETF	306.9
7	Xetra Gold ETF	ETF	226.9
8	ZKB Physical Gold	ETF	169.4
9	Sprott Physical Gold Trust	CEF	69.3
10	SPDR Gold MiniShares	ETF	66.0
11	Central Fund of Canada	CEF	52.7
12	Julius Baer Physical Gold Fund	ETF	49.1
13	BullionVault	Bailment	34.2
14	GoldMoney	Bailment	34.1
15	ETFS Physical Swiss Gold Shares	ETF	26.3
16	ABSA NewGold Exchange Traded Fund	ETF	22.0
17	Central GoldTrust	CEF	21.9
-	Total for the above 17		64,960

== World holdings ==
(2011) (source: United States Geological Survey)
Location	Gold holdings (in tonnes)	Share of total world gold holdings
Total	171,300	100%
Jewellery	84,300	49.2%
Investment (bars, coins)	33,000	19.26%
Central banks	29,500	17.2%
Industrial	20,800	12.14%
Unaccounted	3,700	2.2%

== See also ==
- List of countries by gold production
- Gold as an investment
- Gold mining
- Gold Panic of 1869
- Vaulted gold
- Gold standard
- Fort Knox
- Silver as an investment
- Gold reserve
