= Gold exchange-traded product =

Funds used to own gold as an investment

Gold exchange-traded products are exchange-traded products (ETPs) that seek to provide exposure to gold or to the market price of gold. They include exchange-traded funds (ETFs), closed-end funds (CEFs), and exchange-traded notes (ETNs). Gold ETPs are traded on the major stock exchanges including the SIX Swiss Exchange, the Bombay Stock Exchange, the London Stock Exchange, the Paris Bourse, and the New York Stock Exchange. Each gold ETF, ETN, and CEF has a different structure outlined in its prospectus. Some such instruments do not necessarily hold physical gold. For example, gold ETNs generally track the price of gold using derivatives.

The funds pay their annual expenses such as storage, insurance, and management fees to the sponsor by selling a small amount of gold; therefore, the amount of gold in each share will gradually decline over time. The annual fee charged by State Street Corporation as sponsor of SPDR Gold Shares, the largest gold-backed fund in the world, is 0.40% of the assets in the fund.

In some countries, gold ETFs represent a way to avoid the sales tax or the value-added tax which would apply to physical gold coins and gold bars.

In the United States, sales of a gold ETF that holds the physical commodity are treated as sales of the underlying commodity and thus are taxed at the 28% long term and 35% short term capital gains tax rate for collectibles, rather than the rates applied to stock sales.

Owners of these instruments may be at risk of the failure of the trustee or custodian.

== History ==
The first gold ETP was Central Fund of Canada, a CEF founded in 1961. It amended its articles of incorporation in 1983 to provide investors with a product for ownership of gold and silver bullion. It has been listed on the Toronto Stock Exchange since 1966 and the American Stock Exchange since 1986.

The idea of a gold ETF was first conceptualized by Benchmark Asset Management Company Private Ltd in India, which filed a proposal with the Securities and Exchange Board of India (SEBI) in May 2002. It received approval from SEBI in January 2007.

The first gold ETF launched was Gold Bullion Securities, which listed 28 March 2003 on the Australian Securities Exchange, by ETF Securities and its major shareholder, Graham Tuckwell. A history of the birth of the first gold ETFs was published by the London Bullion Market Association in 2021.

On November 18, 2004, State Street Corporation launched SPDR Gold Shares, which surpassed $1 billion in assets within its first three trading days. As of 2019, it was the largest gold-backed ETF in the world and it had more than $40 billion in assets and $1.7 billion in daily trading volume.

In March 2020, the Royal Mint entered the Gold ETF market and listed its first financial product "The Royal Mint Physical Gold – RMAU", making it the first Gold ETF issued by a European Sovereign entity. The fund is 100% backed by physical gold bars, held at the Royal Mint site near Cardiff in Wales.

In February 2021, Wilshire Phoenix launched the wShares Enhanced Gold Trust which tracks the Wilshire Gold Index, a proprietary index that uses an adaptive exposure approach to automatically rebalance physical gold and cash based on changing market conditions. WGLD seeks to outperform a stand-alone investment in gold and reduce volatility without the use of any futures, leverage, or derivatives to achieve its investment objective.

== See also ==
- Digital gold currency
- Gold as an investment
- Official gold reserves
- Royal Mint Gold
- Silver exchange-traded product
- Vaulted gold
