= SPDR Gold Shares =

Exchange-traded fund

SPDR Gold Shares (also known as SPDR Gold Trust) is part of the SPDR family of exchange-traded funds (ETFs) managed and marketed by State Street Global Advisors (SSGA). For a few years, the fund was the second-largest ETF in the world, and it was briefly the largest. As of April 2026, it remains in the top ten.

This ETF denotes a fixed amount of gold bullion, unlike many ETFs, which represent ownership in a basket of stocks. SPDR Gold Shares are designed to initially track the price of a tenth of a troy ounce of gold. If the share price differs from the gold market price, the fund's manager exchanges blocks of 100,000 shares for 10,000 ounces of gold. The possibility of such exchanges keeps the ETF price roughly in line with the gold price, although the prices can diverge during each day.

As of March 31, 2019, the trust had 24,572,554.8 ounces of vaulted gold in its custody, representing an asset value of $31,697,578,486.50. SPDR Gold Shares is one of the top ten largest holders of gold in the world.

== History ==
In November 2004, the fund was listed (under the name streetTRACKS Gold Shares) on the New York Stock Exchange (NYSE) by SSGA with World Gold Council sponsorship. Since 13 December 2007 and following a name change on 20 May 2008, SPDR Gold Shares has traded on NYSE Arca (NYSE Arca: GLD). It also trades on the Hong Kong Stock Exchange (SEHK: 2840), Singapore Stock Exchange (SGX:GLD 10US$), and Tokyo Stock Exchange (TYO: 1326). In June 2018, State Street started the Gold MiniShares (NYSE Arca: GLDM) Trust with a lower expense ratio of 0.18% and a lower NAV at one-hundredth the price of an ounce of gold.

== Competitors ==
SPDR Gold Shares competes with iShares Gold Trust (NYSE Arca: IAU). There is also iShares Silver Trust (NYSE Arca: SLV).

== Management ==
The Trust's gold bullion is stored as London Good Delivery gold bars (400 oz.) and held in their vault in London or by several custodians worldwide. The ETF pays an expense charge of 0.40% per annum.

== See also ==
- ETF Securities
- Gold as an investment
