= 1999–2002 sale of British gold reserves =

Sale of half of the UK's gold reserves between 1999 and 2002

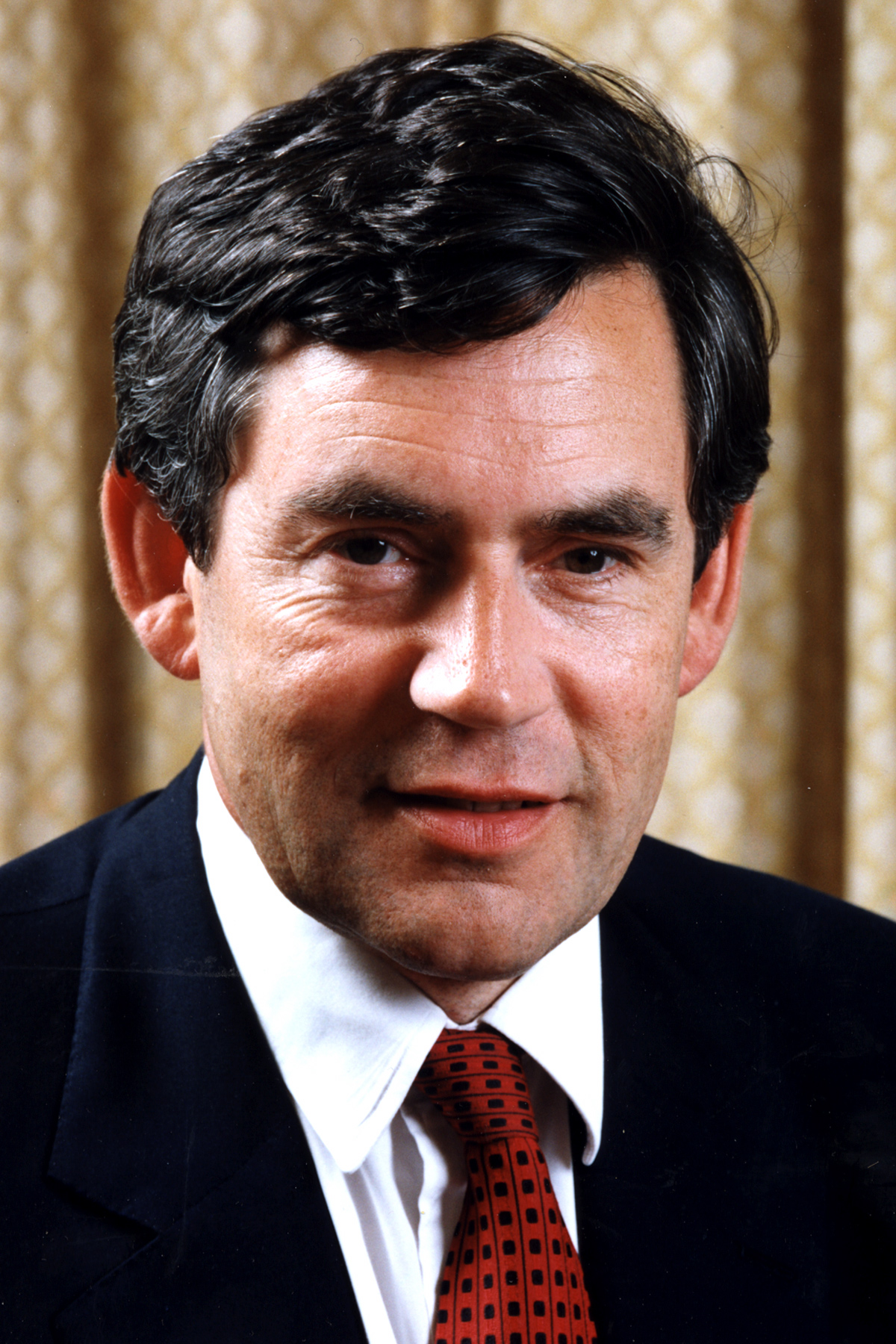
Gordon Brown, the Chancellor of the Exchequer at the time, was principally responsible for the decision.

The sale of the British gold reserve was a policy pursued by HM Treasury between 1999 and 2002, when gold prices were at their lowest in 20 years, following an extended declining market. 395 tonnes of gold, or about half of the reserve, was sold off in a series of auctions, netting the Treasury $3.5 billion. In the ensuing 25 years, from 1999 to 2024, the price of gold increased at an average rate of 8% annually.

Responsibility for the sale lay with Gordon Brown, the Chancellor of the Exchequer. This led some commentators to nickname the dip Brown Bottom or Brown's Bottom.

== Events ==
The British government's intention to sell gold and reinvest the proceeds in foreign currency deposits, including euros, was announced on 7 May 1999, when the price of gold stood at US$282.40 per ounce (cf. the price in January of 1980: $850/oz) The official stated reason for this sale was to diversify the assets of the UK's reserves away from gold, which was deemed to be too volatile. However, many critics believe that the decision to invest 40% of the gold sale proceeds into euro denominated assets was to show public support for the new euro currency. The gold sales funded a like-for-like purchase of financial instruments in different currencies. Studies performed by HM Treasury had shown that the overall volatility of the UK's reserves could be reduced by 20% from the sale.

The advance notice of the substantial sales drove the price of gold down by 10% by the time of the first auction on 6 July 1999. With many gold traders shorting, gold reached a low point of US$252.80 on 20 July. The UK eventually sold about 395 tonnes (12,700,000 ozt) of gold over 17 auctions from July 1999 to March 2002, at an average price of about US$275 per ounce, raising approximately US$3.5 billion.

To deal with this and other prospective sales of gold reserves, a consortium of central banks — including the European Central Bank and the Bank of England — were pushed to sign the Washington Agreement on Gold in September 1999, limiting gold sales to 400 tonnes (13,000,000 ozt) per year for 5 years. This triggered a sharp rise in the price of gold, from around US$260 per ounce to around $330 per ounce in two weeks, before the price fell away again into 2000 and early 2001. The Central Bank Gold Agreement was renewed in 2004 and 2009.

== Analysis ==
Brown's actions have attracted considerable criticism, particularly concerning his timing, his decision to announce the move in advance, and the use of an auction. The decision to sell gold at the low point in the price cycle has been likened, with hindsight, by Quentin Letts to the mistakes in 1992 that led to Black Wednesday, when the UK was forced to withdraw from the European Exchange Rate Mechanism, which HM Treasury has estimated cost the British taxpayer around £3.3 billion. By 2025, with gold prices at $4.4k per oz, the $3.5bn of gold sold by Brown would have been worth $56bn.

It has also been argued that the sale of the gold reserves was a positive decision in that gold had been historically under-performing and was paying no dividends to the Exchequer and the sale enabled the British government to pay off a substantial part of the national debt and keep repayment interest rates down on the remainder.

As of December 2013, the UK retained a gold reserve of 310.3 tonnes (9,980,000 ozt).

== See also ==
- Gold as an investment
