= Royal Mint Gold =

Digital currency project

- Industry: Blockchain; Cryptocurrency
- Defunct: 2018

Royal Mint Gold was a digital gold currency and a cryptocurrency backed by gold reserves in the UK Royal Mint. The Royal Mint launched a digitized token called RMG, representing one gram of physical gold per token, in 2016. It began testing blockchain transactions in April 2017. The first test transaction was in August 2017. The rollout was originally scheduled to occur by the end of 2017. US-based CME Group (Chicago Mercantile Exchange) was tentatively set to administer the trading. At the time, The Daily Telegraph said it "appears somewhat similar to an exchange-traded fund such as ETF Securities Physical Gold".

The project collapsed in 2018, when CME pulled out and the UK Royal Mint was hesitant to find a new partner.

== Implementation ==
The blockchain used is the Prova open-source distributed ledger. A proof-of-stake algorithm demonstrates ownership of the physical gold. BitGo provided blockchain code.

=== Backing gold ===
The Royal Mint stated, that "All gold is held within the highly secure storage facilities in The Royal Mint's vault and The Royal Mint acts solely as sub-custodian and has no claim on the gold" and that gold delivery would be possible, with additional fabrication fees for amounts less than a London Good Delivery bar (400 oz, worth about US$400,000 on January 31, 2018).

== Cancellation ==
Around October 25, 2018, the UK Government cancelled the Mint's plans to issue cryptocurrency, after a change in management at CME led the group to pull out and left the UK Royal Mint without a trading venue.
