= Vaulted gold =

Bullion stored in bank vaults

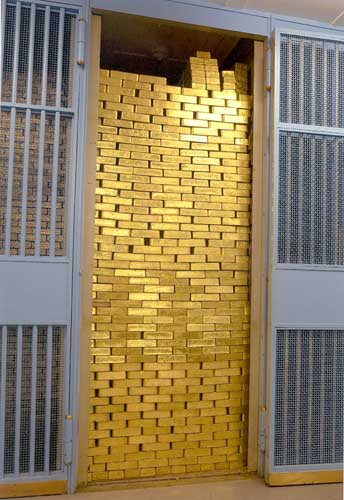
A gold vault in New York

Vaulted gold denotes gold bullion stored in bank vaults. Buyers of vaulted gold obtain outright ownership of the physical gold which is held for them in a vault. This is unlike structured gold products such as gold-based exchange traded funds (ETFs), which only reflect the price of gold while the investor has no ownership of the gold.

Vaulted gold typically comes with withdrawal or delivery options for a fee, i.e., investors can request delivery of their holdings or pick up holdings directly from the vault.

== History ==
Historically, vaulted gold was primarily offered by wealthy private banks, e.g., Swiss private banks, in the form of gold accounts. However, new providers—including both banks and non-banks (e.g., precious metals traders)—have started to offer vaulted gold or savings plans based on vaulted gold to private investors in the late 20th century. For example, some of the first gold accumulation plans were introduced by the precious metals trading company Tanaka Kikinzoku Kogyo during the 1980s.

In addition to classical banks and precious metals traders, new online providers like direct banks or non-banks have started offering vaulted gold products to investors. These providers include Everbank in the United States, BullionVault in Great Britain, GoldMoney in the British Channel Islands and GoldRepublic in the Netherlands, among others.

== Difference ==
Buyers of vaulted gold acquire direct ownership in gold. Buyers of structured products, which are based on the price of gold, acquire a claim against the issuer of the product, but no outright ownership in gold. Exchange traded funds (ETF) or exchange traded commodities (ETC) can be backed by vaulted gold. In legal terms, the position of an owner of such shares with regards to the physical gold is very different from the one of an owner of outright vaulted gold.

In the wholesale precious-metals market, delivery of gold may be effected in several ways, including physical delivery at the vault of a dealer or elsewhere, credit to an allocated or unallocated account with a dealer, or settlement through London precious-metals clearing to an unallocated account of a third party.

Bullion banks offer so-called gold accounts. Allocated gold accounts provide investors with full ownership of vaulted gold, while unallocated gold accounts provide investors only with claims against the provider, rather than any outright ownership in gold. Typically, bullion banks do not deal in quantities of less than 1000 oz (about U.S. $1.7 million) in either type of account, which means that gold accounts are mainly targeted at institutional or very wealthy private investors.

Unallocated accounts are widely used in the wholesale precious-metals market because they allow metal balances to be transferred quickly without allocating individual bars for each transaction. The LBMA states that probably more than 90% of precious metals traded on the interbank, wholesale and OTC market clear over unallocated Loco London accounts.

== Characteristics ==
While gold-backed ETFs are financial securities and therefore subject to financial market regulation, many other forms of gold investment products are, for the most part, unregulated. However, in the Netherlands, professionally vaulted gold is treated as an ‘Investment Object’ and therefore falls under the regulation of the Netherlands Authority for the Financial Markets (AFM).

Retail-gold investment guidance also treats storage, delivery, legal ownership and audit arrangements as key features of managed gold products based on vaulted gold. The World Gold Council's retail-investment guidance states that such products should provide clear information on storage arrangements, fees, the investor's legal ownership rights, and whether the gold is subject to regular independent audit.

Investor-protection guidance for physical precious metals also emphasises verification of the seller and the cost structure of the product. The Financial Industry Regulatory Authority advises investors to check the background of the salesperson and company before investing, and notes that firms selling or storing precious metals may charge account-opening fees, sales commissions, storage fees, management fees and other costs.

== Risks ==
In addition to the market price risk of gold as an investment, buyers of vaulted gold bear a liquidity risk, which can vary significantly by provider and product features.

Furthermore, investors bear the potential risk that gold holdings are embezzled by a provider, custodian, or individual, or stolen by third parties. According to the World Gold Council, investors should check that “providers of vaulted gold services are offering outright, unencumbered gold ownership, do not lease any gold without prior approval from clients, store the gold with an independent and accredited vault operator and regularly allow inspections and audits of client gold holdings." In addition, the gold should be fully insured against standard risks.

There are various critics of fraudulent or overpriced gold investment schemes or inappropriate sales tactics used by some gold dealers or Multi-Level-Marketing companies. World Gold Council investor guidance advises retail gold buyers to consider whether potential returns and risks are stated objectively and whether they can make investment decisions without undue pressure. The UK's Financial Conduct Authority identifies pressure to act quickly and promises of high returns on an investment as warning signs of scams.

The United States Federal Trade Commission also warns that precious-metals and coin investment scams may involve sellers presenting themselves as metal dealers or rare-coin merchants, creating urgency to induce quick purchases, misrepresenting their credentials or experience, and failing to deliver what was promised.

== See also ==
- Bullion
- Gold bar
- Good Delivery
- London bullion market
- London Bullion Market Association
- Gold as an investment
- Gold reserve
