= Gold as an investment =

Use of gold as a store of value and investment asset

Gold
ISO 4217
- Code: XAU (numeric: 959)

Units of account
- Symbol: XAU

Demographics
- User(s): Investors

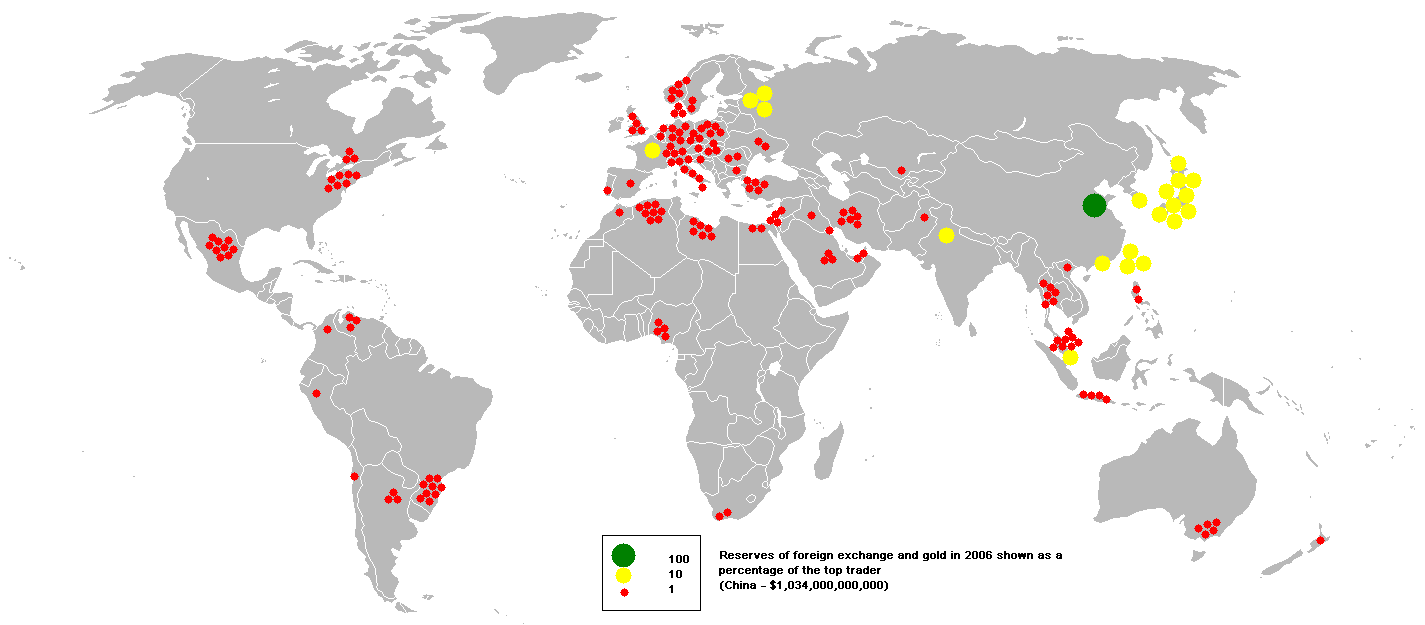
Reserves of SDR, forex and gold in 2006

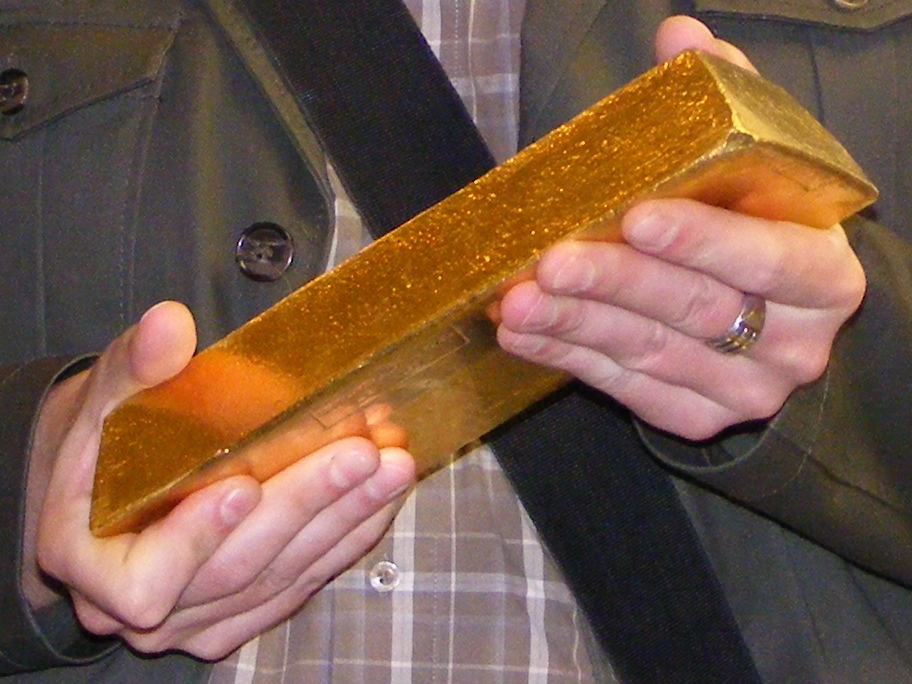
A Good Delivery bar, the standard for trade in the major international gold markets

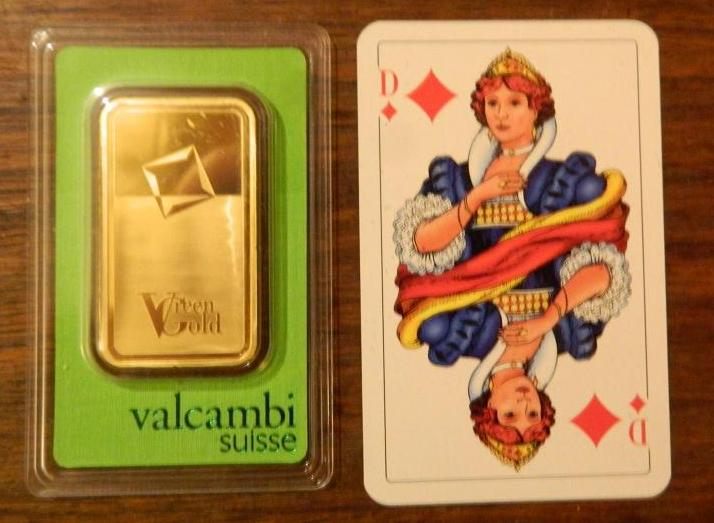
Size of a 100-gram gold bar - packaged inside an assay for proof of authenticity - compared to a playing card

Gold, alongside platinum and silver, is highly popular among precious metals as an investment. Investors generally buy gold as a way of diversifying risk, especially through the use of futures contracts and derivatives. The gold market is subject to speculation and volatility as are other markets.

== Gold price ==
Gold prices (US$ per troy ounce), in nominal US$ and inflation adjusted US$ from 1914 onward

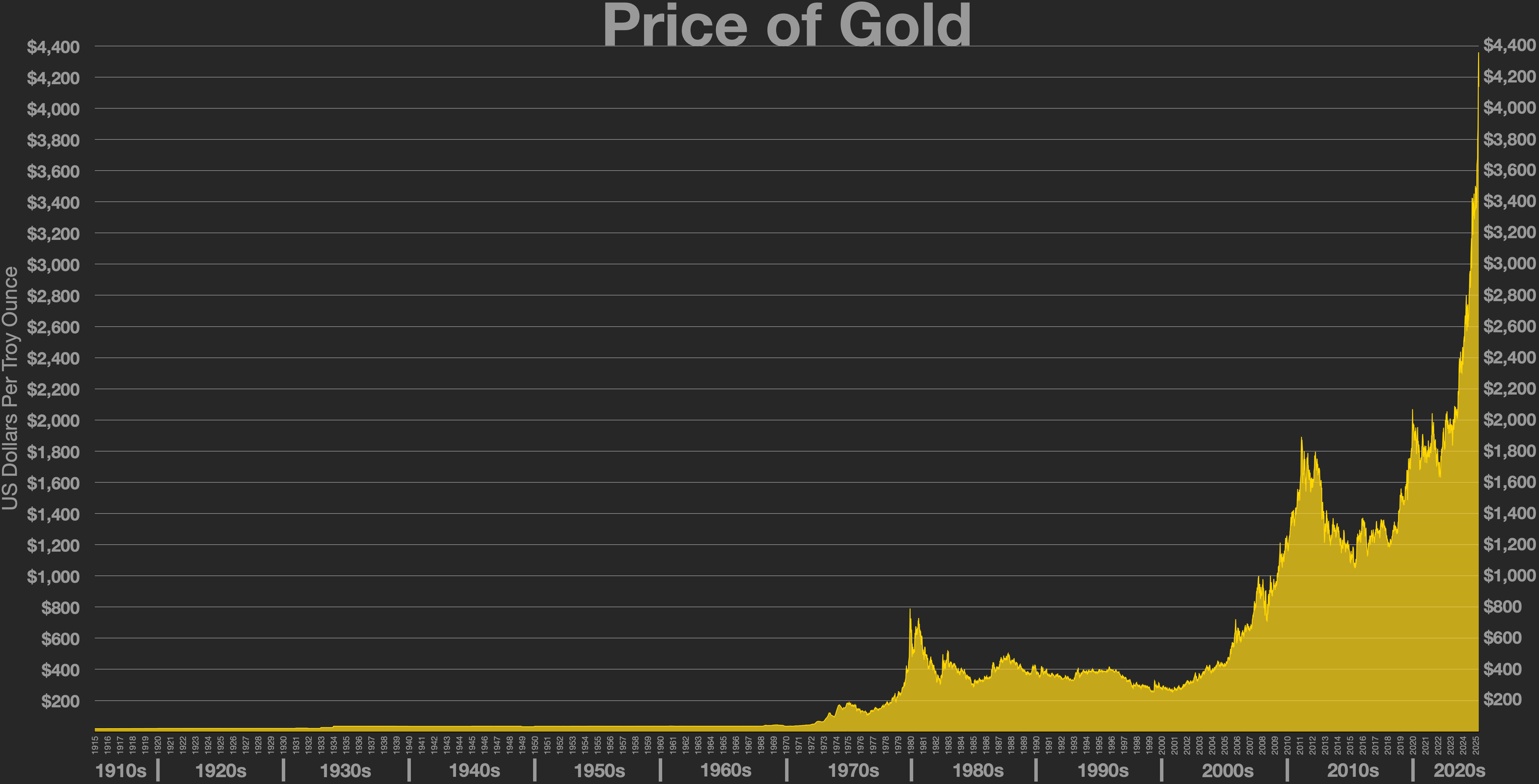
Price of gold 1915–2022

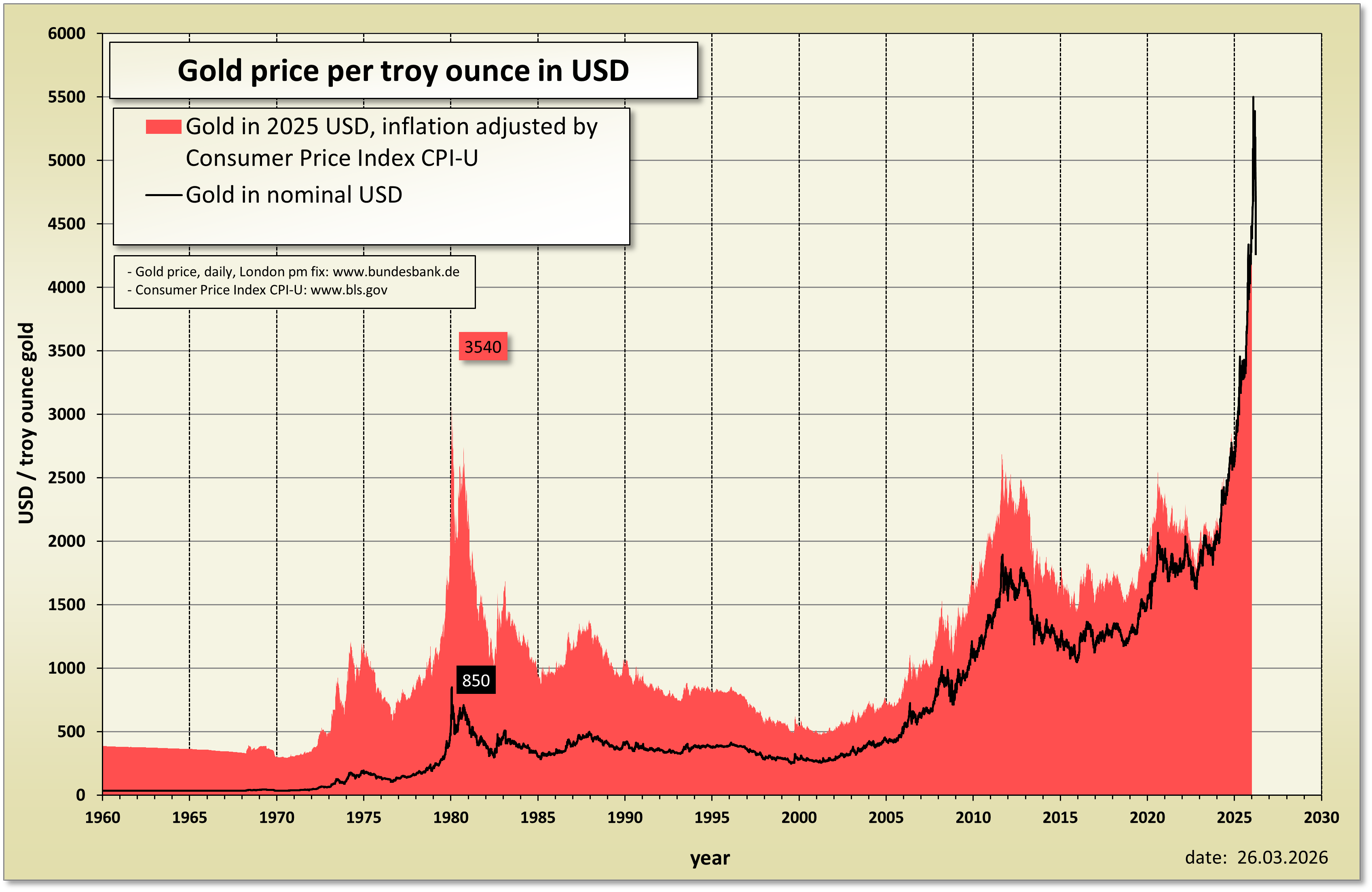
Gold price history in 1960–present

Gold price per gram between Jan 1971 and Jan 2012. The graph shows nominal price in US dollars, the price in 1971 and 2011 US dollars. The notable peak in 1980 followed the Soviet military involvement in Afghanistan, after a decade of inflation, oil shocks, and American military failures.

Gold has been used throughout history as money and has been a relative standard for currency equivalents specific to economic regions or countries, until recent times. Many European countries implemented gold standards in the latter part of the 19th century until these were temporarily suspended in the financial crises involving World War I. After World War II, the Bretton Woods system pegged the United States dollar to gold at a rate of US$35 per troy ounce. The system existed until the 1971 Nixon shock, when the US unilaterally suspended the direct convertibility of the United States dollar to gold and made the transition to a fiat currency system. The last major currency to be divorced from gold was the Swiss franc in 2000.

Since 1919 the most common benchmark for the price of gold has been the London gold fixing, a twice-daily telephone meeting of representatives from five bullion-trading firms of the London bullion market. Furthermore, gold is traded continuously throughout the world based on the intra-day spot price, derived from over-the-counter gold-trading markets around the world (code "XAU"). The following table sets out the gold price versus various assets and key statistics at five-year intervals.

Year	Gold USD/ ozt	DJIA		World GDP		US Debt		Debt per capita		Trade-weighted US dollar index
Year	Gold USD/ ozt	USD	XAU	USD (trillions)	XAU (billions)	USD (billions)	XAU (billions)	USD	XAU	Trade-weighted US dollar index
1970	37	839	22.7	3.3	89.2	370	10.0	1,874	50.6	
1975	140	852	6.1	6.4	45.7	533	3.8	2,525	18.0	33.0
1980	590	964	1.6	11.8	20.0	908	1.5	4,013	6.8	35.7
1985	327	1,547	4.7	13.0	39.8	1,823	5.6	7,657	23.4	68.2
1990	391	2,634	6.7	22.2	56.8	3,233	8.3	12,892	33.0	73.2
1995	387	5,117	13.2	29.8	77.0	4,974	12.9	18,599	48.1	90.3
2000	273	10,787	39.5	31.9	116.8	5,662	20.7	20,001	73.3	118.6
2005	513	10,718	20.9	45.1	87.9	8,170	15.9	26,752	52.1	111.6
2010	1,410	11,578	8.2	63.2	44.8	14,025	9.9	43,792	31.1	99.9
1970 to 2010 net change, in %
	3,792	1,280	...	...	...	3,691	...	2,237	...	...
1975 (post US off gold standard) to 2010 net change, in %
	929	1,259	...	...	...	2,531	...	1,634	...	...

=== Influencing factors ===
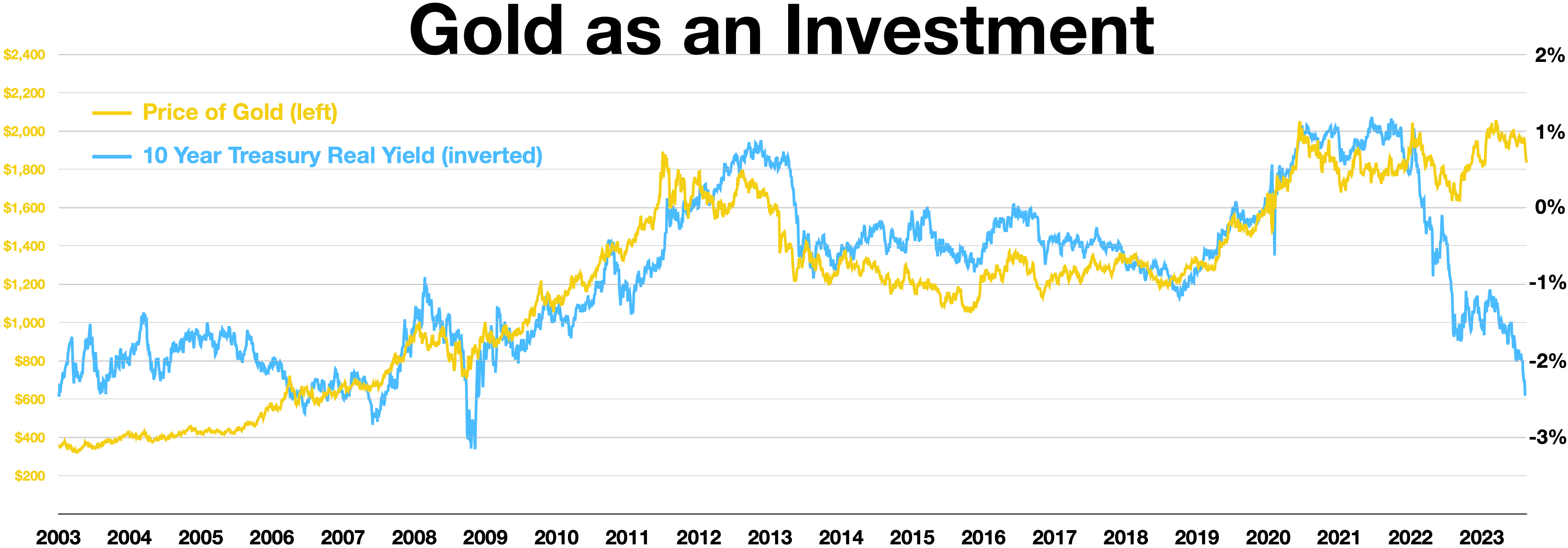
Price of gold 10 year Treasury real yield (inverted)

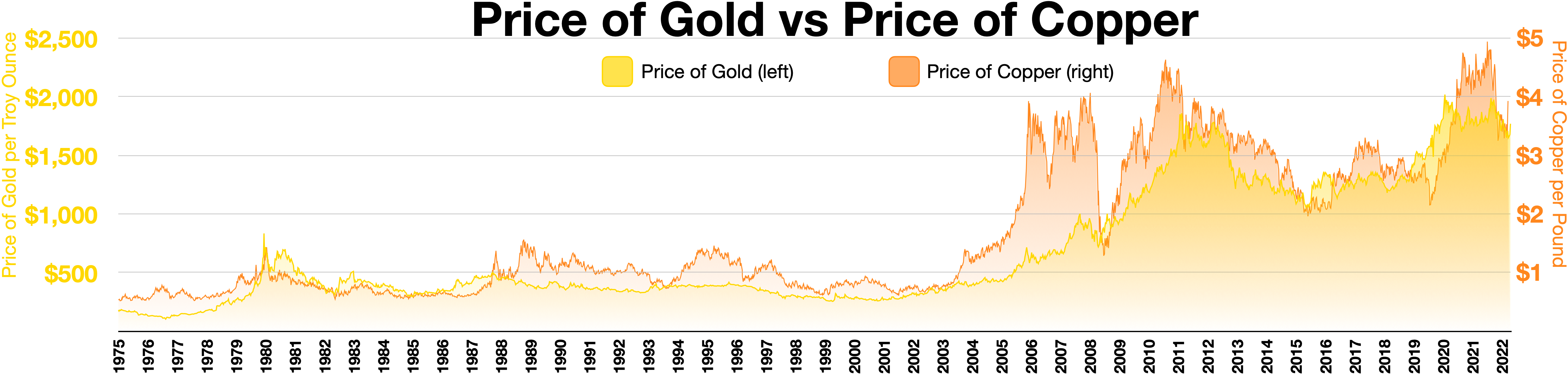
Price of gold vs price of copper Price of gold (left) Price of copper (right)

Like most commodities, the price of gold is driven by supply and demand, including speculative demand. However, unlike most other commodities, saving and disposal play larger roles in affecting its price than its consumption. Most of the gold ever mined still exists in accessible form, such as bullion and mass-produced jewelry, with little value over its fine weight, hence it is nearly as liquid as bullion, and can come back onto the gold market. At the end of 2006, it was estimated that all the gold ever mined totaled 158,000 tonnes (156,000 long tons; 174,000 short tons).

Given the huge quantity of gold stored above ground compared to the annual production, the price of gold is mainly affected by changes in sentiment, which affects market supply and demand equally, rather than on changes in annual production. According to the World Gold Council, annual mine production of gold over the last few years has been close to 2,500 tonnes. About 2,000 tonnes goes into jewelry, industrial and dental production, and around 500 tonnes goes to retail investors and exchange-traded gold funds.

==== Central banks ====
Central banks and the International Monetary Fund play an important role in the gold price. At the end of 2004, central banks and official organizations held 19% of all above-ground gold as official gold reserves. The ten-year Washington Agreement on Gold (WAG), which dates from September 1999, limited gold sales by its members (Europe, United States, Japan, Australia, the Bank for International Settlements and the International Monetary Fund) to less than 400 tonnes a year. In 2009, this agreement was extended for five years, with a limit of 500 tonnes. European central banks, such as the Bank of England and the Swiss National Bank, have been key sellers of gold over this period. In 2014, the agreement was extended another five years at 400 tonnes per year. In 2019 the agreement was not extended again.

Although central banks do not generally announce gold purchases in advance, some, such as Russia, have expressed interest in growing their gold reserves again as of late 2005. In early 2006, China, which only holds 1.3% of its reserves in gold, announced that it was looking for ways to improve the returns on its official reserves. Some bulls hope that this signals that China might reposition more of its holdings into gold, in line with other central banks. Chinese investors began pursuing investment in gold as an alternative to investment in the Euro after the beginning of the Eurozone crisis in 2011. China has since become the world's top gold consumer as of 2013.

The price of gold can be influenced by a number of macroeconomic variables. Such variables include the price of oil, the use of quantitative easing, currency exchange rate movements and returns on equity markets.

Years	Amount of gold sold by IMF	sold to
1970–1971	"as much gold as IMF bought from South Africa"	
1976–1980	50 million ounces (1555 tons)	
1999–2000	14 million ounces (435 tons)	
2009–2010	13 million ounces (403 tons)	200 tons to India
2009–2010	13 million ounces (403 tons)	10 tons to Sri Lanka
2009–2010	13 million ounces (403 tons)	10 tons to Bangladesh
2009–2010	13 million ounces (403 tons)	2 tons to Mauritius
2009–2010	IMF holds a balance of 2,814.1 metric tons of gold	

==== Hedge against inflation ====
Gold, similar to other precious metals such as platinum and silver, may be used as a hedge against inflation or currency devaluation.

Deutsche Bank's view of the point at which gold prices can be considered close to fair value (on October 10, 2014)
	USD/oz
In real terms (PPI)	725
In real terms (CPI)	770
Relative to per capita income	800
Relative to the S&P500	900
Versus copper	1050
Versus crude oil	1400

==== Jewelry and industrial demand ====
Jewelry consistently accounts for over two-thirds of annual gold demand. India is the largest consumer in volume terms, accounting for 27% of demand in 2009, followed by China and the USA.

Industrial, dental and medical uses account for around 12% of gold demand. Gold has high thermal and electrical conductivity properties, along with a high resistance to corrosion and bacterial colonization. Jewelry and industrial demand have fluctuated over the past few years due to the steady expansion in emerging markets of middle classes aspiring to Western lifestyles, offset by the 2008 financial crisis.

==== War, invasion and national emergency ====
When dollars were fully convertible into gold via the gold standard, both were regarded as money. However, many people preferred to carry around paper banknotes rather than the somewhat heavier and less divisible gold coins. If people feared their bank would fail, a bank run might result. This happened in the USA during the Great Depression of the 1930s, leading President Roosevelt to impose a national emergency and issue Executive Order 6102 outlawing the "hoarding" of gold by US citizens. There was only one prosecution under the order, and in that case the order was ruled invalid by federal judge John M. Woolsey, on the technical grounds that the order was signed by the President, not the Secretary of the Treasury as required.

Gold prices surged to a near two-month high in June 2025, driven by heightened geopolitical tensions between Israel and Iran, prompting investors to seek refuge in safe-haven assets like gold and platinum.

==== Gold fatigue ====
At times, the price of gold rises so high that interest wanes, as other investments such as platinum are perceived as better value. During periods of "gold fatigue", investors seek alternative assets including silver, platinum, or non-metal assets such as Bitcoin. The price of platinum rose 44% in early 2025 in part due to gold fatigue, with investors fleeing gold toward platinum, and some sources predicting that platinum would reach $4,000 per ounce before gold does so.

==== Dollar alternative ====
During October 2025, gold prices increased above $4,000 per troy ounce for the first time after increasing more than 50% in the year—the highest yearly increase since the inflationary shock of 1979. According to CME Group, the weakening US dollar, rising US treasury yields, stubborn inflation, robust central bank demand and geopolitical risks help underpin the appreciation. Gold prices hit nearly $5,600 an ounce in January 2026 before dropping to about $4,300 an ounce by late September.

== Investment vehicles ==
=== Bars ===
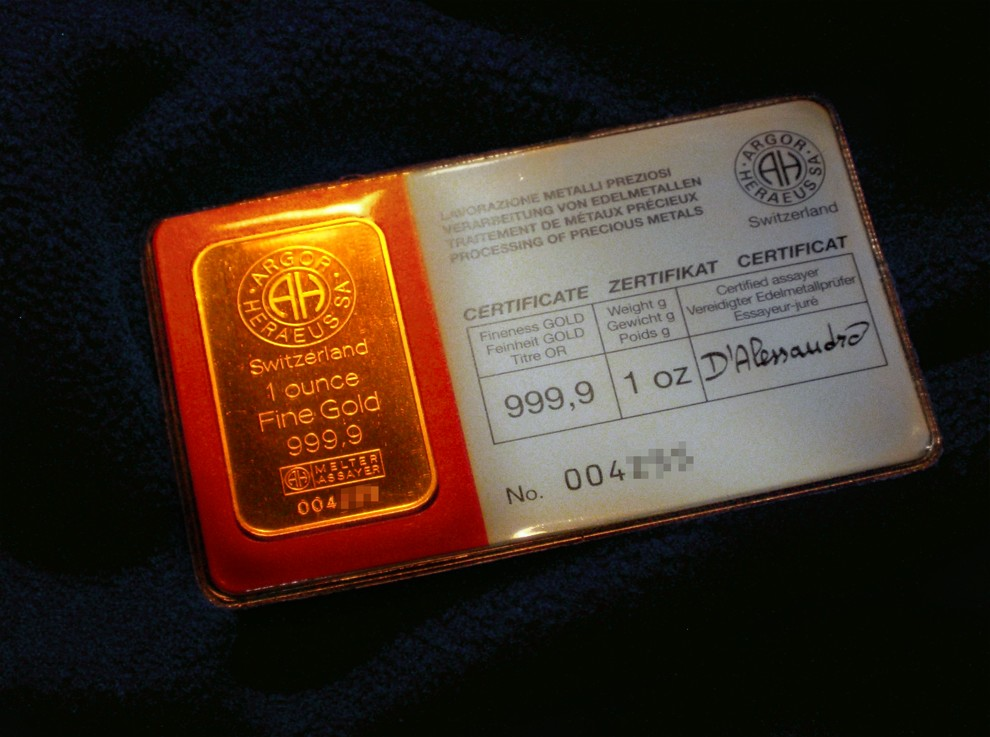
1 troy ounce (31 g) gold bar with certificate

The most traditional way of investing in gold is by buying bullion gold bars. In some countries, like Canada, Austria, Liechtenstein and Switzerland, these can easily be bought or sold at the major banks. Alternatively, there are bullion dealers that provide the same service. Bars are available in various sizes. For example, in Europe, Good Delivery bars are approximately 400 troy ounces (12 kg). 1 kilogram (32.2 ozt) bars are also popular, although many other weights exist, such as the 10 ozt (310 g), 1 ozt (31 g), 10 g, 100 g, 1 kg, 1 tael (50 g in China), and 1 tola (11.3 g).

Bars generally carry lower price premiums than gold bullion coins. However larger bars carry an increased risk of forgery due to their less stringent parameters for appearance. While bullion coins can be easily weighed and measured against known values to confirm their veracity, most bars cannot, and gold buyers often have bars re-assayed. Larger bars also have a greater volume in which to create a partial forgery using a tungsten-filled cavity, which may not be revealed by an assay. Tungsten is ideal for this purpose because it is much less expensive than gold, but has the same density (19.3 g/cm^{3}).

Good delivery bars that are held within the London bullion market (LBMA) system each have a verifiable chain of custody, beginning with the refiner and assayer, and continuing through storage in approved vaults in London. Bars deemed as Good Delivery can be bought and sold conveniently provided the end client has an account with the bullion banks or participating financial institutions (many of which are also LBMA members). If a bar is removed from the vaults in London and stored outside of the chain of integrity, for example stored at home or in a private vault, it may not be as easily traded by the market making members of the Association but it does not mean that members will totally rule out the option of buying the bars back. There may or may not be a need for the bar to be re-assayed before it can be returned to the LBMA chain. Aspects of weighing, packing and delivery are described under "Annex B."

The "chain of integrity" refers to bilateral commercial, arms-length agreement between two parties, and is not wholly characteristic of an entire universe of tradable metals, with any other gold or silver outside of this "LBMA system" being left stranded and illiquid. Bullion products from these trusted refiners are traded at face value by LBMA members without assay testing. By buying bullion from an LBMA member dealer and storing it in an LBMA recognized vault, customers avoid the need of re-assaying or the inconvenience in time and expense it would cost. However this is not 100% universally true; for example, Venezuela is blocked from repatriating government owned gold currently stored in the Bank of England. And as the past shows, there may be risk even in countries considered democratic and stable; for example in the US in the 1930s gold was seized by the government and legal moving was banned.

The LBMA does not approve nor authorize vaults, but merely sets out guidelines. Vaults are approved only to be used between an entity (the LPMCL member) and the vault.

A statement from the Singapore Bullion Market Association further suggested that bullion outside the Loco London chain of integrity is not automatically rendered as stranded, unmarketable or of diminished integrity.

Efforts to combat gold bar counterfeiting include kinebars which employ a unique holographic technology and are manufactured by the Argor-Heraeus refinery in Switzerland.

=== Coins ===
Gold coins are a common way of owning gold. Bullion coins are priced according to their fine weight, plus a small premium based on supply and demand (as opposed to numismatic gold coins, which are priced mainly by supply and demand based on rarity and condition). The sizes of bullion coins range from 0.1 to 2 troy ounces (3.1 to 62.2 g), with the 1 troy ounce (31 g) size being most popular and readily available.

Common gold bullion coins include the Krugerrand, Australian Gold Nugget (Kangaroo), Austrian Philharmoniker (Philharmonic), Austrian 100 Corona, Canadian Gold Maple Leaf, Chinese Gold Panda, Malaysian Kijang Emas, French Napoleon or Louis d'Or, Mexican Gold 50 Peso, British Sovereign, American Gold Eagle, and American Buffalo.

Coins may be purchased from a variety of dealers both large and small. Fake gold coins are common and are usually made of gold-layered alloys.

=== Gold rounds ===
Gold rounds look like gold coins, but they have no currency value. They range in similar sizes as gold coins, including 0.05 troy ounces (1.6 g), 1 troy ounce (31 g), and larger. Unlike gold coins, gold rounds commonly have no additional metals added to them for durability purposes and do not have to be made by a government mint, which allows the gold rounds to have a lower overhead price as compared to gold coins. On the other hand, gold rounds are normally not as collectible as gold coins.

=== Exchange-traded products ===
Gold exchange-traded products may include exchange-traded funds (ETFs), exchange-traded notes (ETNs), and closed-end funds (CEFs), which are traded like shares on the major stock exchanges. The first gold ETF, Gold Bullion Securities (ticker symbol "GOLD"), was launched in March 2003 on the Australian Stock Exchange, and originally represented exactly 0.1 troy ounces (3.1 g) of gold. As of November 2010, SPDR Gold Shares is the second-largest exchange-traded fund in the world by market capitalization.

Gold exchange-traded products (ETPs) represent an easy way to gain exposure to the gold price, without the inconvenience of storing physical bars. However exchange-traded gold instruments, even those that hold physical gold for the benefit of the investor, carry risks beyond those inherent in the precious metal itself. For example, the most popular gold ETP (GLD) has been widely criticized, and even compared with mortgage-backed securities, due to features of its complex structure.

Typically a small commission is charged for trading in gold ETPs and a small annual storage fee is charged. The annual expenses of the fund such as storage, insurance, and management fees are charged by selling a small amount of gold represented by each certificate, so the amount of gold in each certificate will gradually decline over time.

Exchange-traded funds, or ETFs, are investment companies that are legally classified as open-end companies or unit investment trusts (UITs), but that differ from traditional open-end companies and UITs. The main differences are that ETFs do not sell directly to investors and they issue their shares in what are called "Creation Units" (large blocks such as blocks of 50,000 shares). Also, the Creation Units may not be purchased with cash but a basket of securities that mirrors the ETF's portfolio. Usually, the Creation Units are split up and re-sold on a secondary market.

ETF shares can be sold in two ways: The investors can sell the individual shares to other investors, or they can sell the Creation Units back to the ETF. In addition, ETFs generally redeem Creation Units by giving investors the securities that comprise the portfolio instead of cash. Because of the limited redeemability of ETF shares, ETFs are not considered to be and may not call themselves mutual funds.

=== Certificates ===
Gold certificates allow gold investors to avoid the risks and costs associated with the transfer and storage of physical bullion (such as theft, large bid–offer spread, and metallurgical assay costs) by taking on a different set of risks and costs associated with the certificate itself (such as commissions, storage fees, and various types of credit risk).

Banks may issue gold certificates for gold that is allocated (fully reserved) or unallocated (pooled). Unallocated gold certificates are a form of fractional reserve banking and do not guarantee an equal exchange for metal in the event of a run on the issuing bank's gold on deposit. Allocated gold certificates should be correlated with specific numbered bars, although it is difficult to determine whether a bank is improperly allocating a single bar to more than one party.

The first paper bank notes were gold certificates. They were first issued in the 17th century when they were used by goldsmiths in England and the Netherlands for customers who kept deposits of gold bullion in their vault for safe-keeping. Two centuries later, the gold certificates began being issued in the United States when the US Treasury issued such certificates that could be exchanged for gold. The United States Government first authorized the use of the gold certificates in 1863. On April 5, 1933, the US Government restricted the private gold ownership in the United States and therefore, the gold certificates stopped circulating as money (this restriction was reversed on January 1, 1975). Nowadays, gold certificates are still issued by gold pool programs in Australia and the United States, as well as by banks in Germany, Switzerland and Vietnam.

=== Accounts ===
Many types of gold "accounts" are available. Different accounts impose varying types of intermediation between the client and their gold. One of the most important differences between accounts is whether the gold is held on an allocated (fully reserved) or unallocated (pooled) basis. Unallocated gold accounts are a form of fractional reserve banking and do not guarantee an equal exchange for metal in the event of a run on the issuer's gold on deposit. Another major difference is the strength of the account holder's claim on the gold, in the event that the account administrator faces gold-denominated liabilities (due to a short or naked short position in gold for example), asset forfeiture, or bankruptcy.

Some Swiss banks offer gold accounts where gold can be instantly bought or sold just like any foreign currency on a fractional reserve basis or on a fully allocated basis. Pool accounts, such as those offered by some providers, facilitate highly liquid but unallocated claims on gold owned by the company. Digital gold currency systems operate like pool accounts and additionally allow the direct transfer of fungible gold between members of the service. Other operators, by contrast, allows clients to create a bailment on allocated (non-fungible) gold, which becomes the legal property of the buyer.

Typically, bullion banks only deal in quantities of 1,000 troy ounces (31 kg) or more in either allocated or unallocated accounts. For private investors, vaulted gold offers private individuals to obtain ownership in professionally vaulted gold starting from minimum investment requirements of several thousand U.S.-dollars or denominations as low as one gram.

=== Derivatives, CFDs and spread betting ===
Derivatives, such as gold forwards, futures and options, currently trade on various exchanges around the world and over-the-counter (OTC) directly in the private market. In the U.S., gold futures are primarily traded on the New York Commodities Exchange (COMEX) and Euronext.liffe. In India, gold futures are traded on the National Commodity and Derivatives Exchange (NCDEX) and Multi Commodity Exchange (MCX).

== Investment strategies ==
=== Fundamental analysis ===
Investors using fundamental analysis analyze the macroeconomic situation, which includes international economic indicators, such as GDP growth rates, inflation, interest rates, productivity and energy prices. They would also analyze the yearly global gold supply versus demand.

=== Gold versus stocks ===
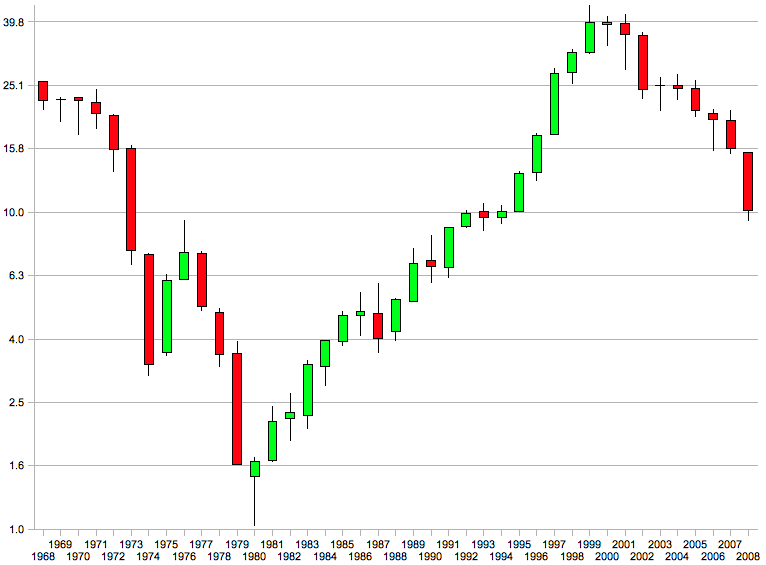
Dow/Gold Ratio 1968–2008

The performance of gold bullion is often compared to stocks as different investment vehicles. Gold is regarded by some as a store of value (without growth) whereas stocks are regarded as a return on value (i.e., growth from anticipated real price increase plus dividends). Stocks and bonds perform best in a stable political climate with strong property rights and little turmoil. The attached graph shows the value of Dow Jones Industrial Average divided by the price of an ounce of gold. Since 1800, stocks have consistently gained value in comparison to gold in part because of the stability of political systems in the west. This appreciation has been cyclical with long periods of stock outperformance followed by long periods of gold outperformance. The Dow Industrials bottomed out a ratio of 1:1 with gold during 1980 (the end of the 1970s bear market) and proceeded to post gains throughout the 1980s and 1990s. The gold price peak of 1980 also coincided with the Soviet Union's invasion of Afghanistan. The ratio peaked on January 14, 2000, a value of 41.3 and has fallen sharply since.

One argument follows that in the long-term, gold's high volatility when compared to stocks and bonds, means that gold does not hold its value compared to stocks and bonds:

To take an extreme example [of price volatility], while a US dollar invested in bonds in 1801 would be worth nearly a thousand dollars by 1998, a US dollar invested in stocks that same year would be worth more than half a million dollars in real terms. Meanwhile, a US dollar invested in gold in 1801 would by 1998 be worth just 78 cents.

== Taxation ==
Gold maintains a special position in the market with many tax regimes. The taxation of gold is regulated very differently around the world and depends on the respective national laws. As a rule, a distinction is made between investment gold, gold jewelry and financial products such as ETFs or futures.

- Sales tax (VAT): Investment gold such as bars and coins with a high degree of purity is exempt from VAT in many countries. Investment gold enjoys preferential tax treatment in the European Union and Switzerland. By contrast, gold jewelry is subject to sales tax in most countries because it is considered a consumer good.
- Capital gains tax: Profits from the sale of investment gold are treated as capital gains in many countries and taxed accordingly. In the US, special tax rates apply to physical gold, which is also handled differently in the various states. By contrast, Switzerland, for example, does not levy any capital gains tax on private gold sales. In other countries, such as Australia, however, reduced tax rates may apply if the gold is held for more than a year.
- Import duties: Some countries, such as India, impose high import duties on gold to protect their domestic economies and balance of trade.
- Virtual gold: Trading in gold in the form of financial products such as ETFs or futures is subject to specific tax regulations in most countries. Profits from these investments are often categorized as capital gains and taxed at the corresponding tax rates.

The tax treatment of gold often reflects economic policy priorities, such as protecting domestic industry or promoting investment. Given the complex and country-specific regulations, a thorough knowledge of the applicable tax rules is crucial for investors and traders.

== Scams and frauds ==
Gold attracts various forms of fraudulent activity. Some of the most common are:

- High-yield investment programs – HYIPs are usually just dressed up pyramid schemes, with no real value underneath. Using gold in their prospectus makes them seem more solid and trustworthy.
- Advance fee fraud – Various emails circulate on the Internet for buyers or sellers of up to 10,000 metric tonnes of gold (an amount greater than US Federal Reserve holdings). Through the use of fake legalistic phrases, such as "Swiss Procedure" or "FCO" (Full Corporate Offer), naive middlemen are drafted as hopeful brokers. The endgame of these scams varies, with some attempting to extract a small "validation" amount from the innocent buyer/seller (in hopes of hitting the big deal), and others focused on draining the bank accounts of their targeted dupes.
- Counterfeit gold coins.
- Shares in fraudulent mining companies with no gold reserves, or potential of finding gold. For example, the Bre-X scandal in 1997.
- There have been instances of fraud when the seller keeps possession of the gold. In the early 1980s, when gold prices were high, two major frauds were International Gold Bullion Exchange and Bullion Reserve of North America. More recently the 2008 fraud at e-Bullion resulted in a loss for investors, that was only reimbursed to them in April 2019.

== See also ==
- Gold fixing – Setting of the price of gold
- Gold repatriation – Relocation of sovereign gold reserves
- Full-reserve banking – Offering of loans exclusively from time deposits
- Gold exchange-traded product – Funds used to own gold as an investment
- Inflation hedge – Investment intended to protect an investor against inflation or hedge
- Vaulted gold – Bullion stored in bank vaults
- Peak gold – Process of extracting gold from the ground
- Gold reserve – State-held stockpile of gold bullion
- Traditional investments – Investment in well-known assets and shares
- Alternative investments – Investments other than stocks, bonds and cash
- List of bullion dealers

=== Other precious metals and diamonds as investments ===
- Diamonds as an investment
- Palladium as an investment
- Platinum as an investment
- Silver as an investment – Investment in the precious metal silver
