= International Gold Bullion Exchange =

Gold dealer in the United States

International Gold Bullion Exchange was a gold bullion dealer that committed major fraud during the early 1980s.

International Gold Bullion Exchange was founded in 1979 by brothers William and James Alderdice. It grew to be reportedly the largest retail gold bullion dealer in the United States. It offered sale and storage of gold and silver bullion and coins. The company would sell gold bullion at a discount if the buyer agreed to postpone taking delivery. It was headquartered in Ft. Lauderdale, Florida, with offices in Los Angeles and Dallas and employed over 1000 people. The company advertised in national publications like the Wall Street Journal and Barron's.

The company filed Chapter 11 bankruptcy in April 1983 and then ceased operating. When the company's offices were raided by law enforcement, it turned out that the gold bar stacks shown in their advertising were only wooden blocks painted a gold color. While it operated the company collected over $140 million. At the time it shut down, there were $75 million in claims by 23,000 people. The company spent over $44 million on personal spending, salaries, marketing and travel and had little in assets when it shut down.

During the summer of 1983, the Alderdice brothers were Indicted in New York state on charges of grand larceny and securities fraud, indicted in Broward County, Florida on 203 counts of fraud and theft, and indicted by a federal grand jury on charges of conspiracy, mail fraud and wire fraud. They were arrested in July 1983 and spent eight months in jail before being able to raise bail. In July 1984 while free on bond, William Alderdice was murdered by James Doyle, a former cell-mate who served as the brothers' chauffeur. In 1985, James Alderdice received a sentence of ten years in federal prison. He had also been convicted in New York state and Broward County, but was allowed to serve those sentences concurrent with the federal sentence.

International Gold Bullion Exchange was one of two major frauds involving sale of gold bullion in 1983, with Bullion Reserve of North America in Los Angeles also being shut down later that year, with losses to customers of $60 million. These frauds came at a time when gold prices had soared and gold as an investment was popular.
