= London Bullion Market Association =

Trade association for precious metals

The London Bullion Market Association (now known simply as LBMA), established in 1987, is the international trade association representing the global Over The Counter (OTC) bullion market, and defines itself as "the global authority on precious metals". As of 2026, it lists 89 Full Members, 93 Affiliate Members and 12 Market Makers across 27 countries, including traders, refiners, producers, miners, fabricators, as well as those providing storage and secure carrier services.

== Functions ==
The LBMA's mission is to support the global precious metals industry by setting standards and developing market services. It oversees the governance of the market and defines how precious metals are refined and traded, most visibly through the London Good Delivery Lists, the Responsible Sourcing programme, and the Global Precious Metals Code introduced in 2017, which all members must follow.

LBMA works with miners, investors, fabricators, ETFs, refiners, manufacturers, consumers, civil society and central banks from around the world. In addition to acting as the voice of the global precious metals market, LBMA is the contact point for regulators, investors and clients.

LBMA has always worked closely with London Precious Metals Clearing Limited (LPMCL), which organises and co-ordinates bullion clearing and vaulting in London for OTC transactions taking place around the world. In 2017 LBMA assumed responsibility for the administrative functions of the LPMCL. It also has a close working relationship with the London Platinum and Palladium Market (LPPM) and there is cross-representation on the Management Committees or Boards of each organisation.

== Board and Committees ==
The LBMA Board has an independent Chairman, as well as Non-Executive Directors, which ensure the independence of the governance of the LBMA. Additionally, there are also elected Market Directors who sit on the Board and ensure the market is steering the development of the Association. Beyond that there are sub-committees and working groups, in which market participants can be engaged and steer the broad spectrum of work undertaken by the LBMA.

== History ==
The Brazilian Gold Rush in the 17th century, and the subsequent gold rushes of California, Australia and South Africa resulted in an influx of gold into the UK. The Bank of England established a bullion vault in London as a result. In 1750 the Bank of England sought to standardise the quality of the gold bars being stored, and so established the London Good Delivery List, originally named the List of Acceptable Melters and Assayers. The List formally recognised those refineries who produced gold bars to a certain standard and could therefore be allowed to enter the London market.

By 1850, five companies - N M Rothschild & Sons, Mocatta & Goldsmid, Pixley & Abell, Samuel Montagu & Co. and Sharps Wilkins had been established. The term London Gold Market refers to these five companies who formed to oversee the operation of the gold market in London. In 1919, it set up the first Gold Price fix at Rothschild's offices. The London Gold Market was also responsible for Good Delivery accreditations and the maintenance of the Good Delivery List.

LBMA was established in 1987 in recognition by the Bank of England of the need for an independent body to oversee the custody, maintenance and regulation of the Good Delivery List, separate from the London Gold Market's increasing number of participants. Its founding CEO was Chris Elston, formerly of the BoE and its founding Chairman was Robert Guy.

LBMA has maintained the gold and also the silver Good Delivery Lists since 1987. Since then LBMA has expanded its focus, services and expertise to focus on the entire global wholesale precious metals market. LBMA has close ties to all stakeholders within the market, including the London Platinum and Palladium Market, London Precious Metals Clearing Ltd, central banks and regulatory bodies.

== Membership ==
LBMA has four main types of Membership: Market-Making Member, Full Member, Affiliate Member, Exchange Affiliate Member and additionally, one Associate membership.

Full Members are organisations which are actively involved in the London bullion market. For example, for entities that trade, this means trading gold or silver bullion or related derivatives such as forwards and options in the "Loco London" market. Members also include fabricators, brokers, refiners and shippers. A number of Members have been reclassified as Market Makers.

Market Makers have the same rights as Full members but also have the additional responsibility to quote bid and offer prices to each other during the London business day, for agreed minimum quantities and tenors in both gold and silver. Market Makers must provide this service across one or more products, being Spot, Options and Forwards. There are thirteen LBMA Market Makers who provide the service in one, two or all three products.

The Associate category includes many different types of market participants. For instance Associates may be traders in other markets. If so, they must have bullion based relationships with LBMA Members. Alternatively, Associates may be companies whose activities are judged to be relevant to the London bullion market, such as inspection, assaying and consultancy.

The main difference in terms of status within the LBMA for Full Members versus Associates is that Associates do not have voting rights. Associates also have more limited options for sponsoring other applications. In the UK bullion market, Associates are not considered by HM Revenue and Customs as members of the market and hence cannot trade under the terms of the Terminal Markets Order. Refiners need to apply for GDL status before they can become an Associate.

=== Applying for membership ===
LBMA coordinates and strictly manages the membership application process. All applicants must nominate three Attesters to support their application. Attesters are selected from the existing membership, with the exact choice dependent upon the type of membership applied for and the applicant's industry type. Submitted applications are presented to the Membership Committee for consideration prior to its recommendations being put forward to the CEO and Board for approval.

== Global Precious Metals Code ==
The Global Precious Metals Code, launched on 25 May 2017 (with some minor amendments made in April, 2018), sets out the standards and best practice expected from market participants in the global Over the Counter (OTC) wholesale precious metals market.

=== Adherence to the Code ===
The Code is intended to define a robust, fair, effective and transparent market where all participants are able to transact following best practice guidelines. It sets out a common set of principles to promote the integrity and effective functioning of the global market covering ethics, governance, compliance and risk management, information sharing and business conduct.

All market participants involved in the global wholesale precious metals market are expected to act according to the principles of the Code. LBMA members were required to attest their conformance with the Code by signing a Statement of Commitment by 1 June 2018.

On 6 February 2018, the Bank of England issued a Statement of Commitment to the Code. By doing so the Bank is demonstrating that it is committed to adhering to the principles of the Code when acting as a market participant within the market, and that its internal practices and processes are aligned with the principles of the Code.

== London Good Delivery ==
Central to LBMA's quality assurance work is the maintenance and publication of the Good Delivery Lists for gold and silver. These lists comprise accredited gold and silver refineries that meet the stringent acceptance criteria. Listed refineries are eligible to produce and ship Good Delivery bars into London. These bars are used to underpin the global OTC gold and silver trades that are settled loco-London. The London Good Delivery standard is universally acknowledged as the de facto international benchmark for the quality of large gold and silver bars.

The List is also used (under licence) by many Futures Exchanges around the world to determine which bars are accepted in their own markets.

=== Good Delivery Accreditation ===
LBMA manages the accreditation process for all Good Delivery listed refiners. This process involves an examination of the company's history and current relationship with the market, its financial standing, its sourcing and refining methods as well as its assaying techniques and abilities. Refiners are required to produce a set of sample bars as part of the process that are inspected for their quality and then independently assayed to ensure that the refiner meets the minimum specifications for consistency, specificity and accuracy in determining the bar's fineness.

LBMA proactively monitors all accredited refiners on a three-year cycle to ensure that the high standards continue to be met.

=== Good Delivery Bars ===
LBMA Good Delivery refiners produce 400-ounce gold bars or 1000 ounce silver bars (also known as 'large' or 'market' bars) that conform to the strict specifications described in the Good Delivery Rules. The Good Delivery Rules defines what is acceptable when it comes to the appearance and the shape of the bars themselves.

== Responsible sourcing ==
LBMA's Responsible Sourcing Programme began back in 2011 in response to US legislation such as Dodd Frank (signed into law by President Obama on 21 July 2010) and legislation concerning conflict minerals.

From its origin, it has always followed the OECD five-step due diligence process as laid out in the OECD Due Diligence Guidance for Responsible Supply Chains of Minerals from Conflict-Affected and High-Risk Areas. LBMA's Responsible Gold Guidance (RGG) (Version 6) was the document first reviewed by the OECD in 2016. Following this, LBMA took the opportunity to clarify some of the language used and expand sections on sourcing responsibly for artisanal and small-scale mines when developing Version 7. This was published in September 2017 and came into force on 1 January 2018.

The OECD Alignment Assessment Findings report states "Many of the core principles of the OECD Guidance were incorporated into the requirements of the RGG (v6). These have been further improved by the revisions introduced by RGG (v7) and the LBMA's standards are now fully aligned with all the overarching due principles of the OECD Guidance."

=== Responsible Sourcing Programme Expansion ===
LBMA continues to expand the range of activities falling within the scope of our Responsible Sourcing Programme. Responsible Silver Guidance was launched in September 2017 and came into force on 1 January 2018. The Responsible Platinum & Palladium Guidance has also been developed and published recently.

This framework, based on the OECD Due Diligence Guidance, gives assurance to investors and consumers that all London gold, silver, platinum and palladium stocks that underpin the global OTC market are conflict-free as well as compliant with international anti-money laundering laws.

== Data ==
=== Bullion Holdings in Vaults ===
Vaulting Statistics were first published by LBMA in 2017. According to this data, amount of gold and silver physically held in London vaults is currently more than 7,700 tonnes of gold and 33,700 tonnes of silver. The gold alone is valued in excess of $330 billion, more than the reported value of the metal held in Fort Knox, Kentucky and second only to the entire holdings of the US Government.

=== Trade Reporting ===
It is anticipated that the true size of the global over-the-counter market in gold, silver, platinum and palladium will be known in 2018. Not only will the actual volume be known for the first time, but the data collected will help form LBMA's dialogue with regulators on matters such as Net Stable Funding Ratio and other measures under Basel III.

LBMA-i is the vehicle by which trade reporting will be collated. It has been set up by Simplitium (formerly known as Boat Services Ltd) on behalf of LBMA. This was in response to the recommendations of the Fair and Effective Markets Review – which was led by the Bank of England and co-chaired by the Financial Conduct Authority and HM Treasury – for greater clarity in financial markets.

It is mandatory for all LBMA members to participate in LBMA-i by reporting their transactions, and there are sanctions for those that do not comply.

The primary responsibility for trade reporting remains with Simplitium to make sure that the scope remains relevant, that all legal and regulatory requirements are met, and that information published does not impinge any confidentiality requirements.

== Precious Metals Prices Limited ==
LBMA's wholly owned subsidiary, Precious Metals Prices Limited, owns the Intellectual Property Rights for the daily spot benchmark prices for gold, silver, platinum and palladium. The administration and calculation of the prices are managed by independent third parties across electronic auction platforms. LBMA Gold, Silver, Platinum and Palladium Prices are the only globally recognized benchmarks for precious metals.

== Events ==
LBMA organises a variety of industry events featuring leading experts, including the Annual Precious Metals Conference, traditionally held at a different location each year. The 2023 conference will be held in Barcelona, while in previous years conferences have been held in Boston, Singapore, Vienna, Shanghai, Rome, Berlin, Hong Kong, Kyoto and Montreal.

The Assaying and Refining Conference is held in London every two years, with the next event taking place on 17–20 March 2019. This event gathers together those working within the world of assaying and refining, attracting people from within the list of accredited Good Delivery refiners, and also without.

LBMA also coordinates a rolling programme of committee meetings and working groups to oversee and assist its work. Social events are organised to facilitate networking for a wide range of market participants, including a Biennial Dinner and an annual party.
