= London bullion market =

Over-the-counter gold and silver market

The London bullion market is a wholesale over-the-counter market for the trading of gold, silver, platinum and palladium. Trading is conducted amongst members of the London Bullion Market Association (LBMA), tightly overseen by the Bank of England. Most of the members are major international banks or bullion dealers and refiners.

The physical characteristics of gold and silver bars used in settlement in market is described by the Good Delivery specification which is a set of rules issued by the LBMA. It also puts forth requirements for listing on the LBMA Good Delivery List of approved refineries.

== Gold trading ==
Internationally, gold is traded via over-the-counter (OTC) transactions, with trading on the New York Mercantile Exchange (NYMEX) and Tokyo Commodity Exchange (TOCOM).

Twice daily, at 10:30 AM and 3:00 PM (local time), the LBMA publishes the gold price in US dollars. These forward contracts are known as gold futures contracts. Spot gold is traded for settlement two business days following the trade date, with a business day defined as a day when both the New York and London markets are open for business.

Unlike many commodity markets, the forward market for gold is driven by spot prices and interest rate differentials, similar to foreign exchange markets, rather than underlying supply and demand dynamics. This is because gold, like currencies, is borrowed and lent by central banks in the interbank market. Interest rates for gold tend to be lower than US domestic interest rates. This encourages gold borrowings so that central banks can earn interest on large gold holdings. Except in special circumstances the gold market tends to be in positive contango, i.e. the forward price of gold is higher than the spot price. Historically this has made it an attractive market for forward sales by gold producers and contributed to an active and relatively liquid derivatives market.

== Market size ==
The bulk of global trading in gold and silver is conducted on the over-the-counter (OTC) market. London is by far the largest global centre for OTC transactions followed by New York, Zurich, and Tokyo. Exchange-based trading has grown in recent years with Comex in New York and Tocom in Tokyo generating most of the activity. Gold is also traded in forms of securities, such as exchange-traded funds (ETFs), on the London, New York, Johannesburg, and Australian stock exchanges.

Although the physical market for gold and silver is distributed globally, most wholesale OTC trades are cleared through London. The average daily volume of gold and silver cleared at the LBMA auctions in May 2019 was 18.6 million troy ounces (2965 transfers, worth $23.9 billion) and 211.8 million troy ounces (978 transfers, worth $3.1 billion) respectively.

The Gold Anti-Trust Action Committee has claimed that clearing data substantially understates the true amount of gold traded due to the netting of trades in the calculation of Clearing Statistics.

== Account types ==
=== Allocated accounts ===
Allocated accounts are accounts held by dealers in clients' names on which are maintained balances of uniquely identifiable bars, plates or ingots of metal 'allocated' to a specific customer and segregated from other metal held in the vault. The client has full title to this metal with the dealer holding it on the client's behalf as custodian. To avoid any doubt, metal in an allocated account does not form part of a precious metal dealer's assets.

=== Unallocated accounts ===
Unallocated accounts represent the most popular way of trading, settling and holding gold, silver, platinum and palladium. Transactions may be settled by credits or debits to the account while the balance represents the indebtedness between the two parties. Credit balances on the account do not entitle the creditor to specific bars of gold or silver or plates or ingots of platinum or palladium but are backed by the general stock of the precious metal dealer with whom the account is held. The client in this scenario is an unsecured creditor.

=== Unallocated risks ===
The total quantity of unallocated gold is estimated to be 15,000 tonnes at the end of 2008 which supports the 2,134 tonnes on average of spot gold trade through London every day representing 14.2% of the pool. This compares to average daily turnover in UK equities of between 0.34% and 0.63% for the 12 months ending September 2009. While members of the LBMA provide no information on the backing for unallocated gold the improbably high turnover is suggestive they are operating a fractional reserve system where unallocated accounts are only partially backed by physical gold. Similarly to a bank run this makes LBMA unallocated gold accounts susceptible to loss if a sufficient number of market participants request delivery of physical bullion.

== Membership ==
LBMA accepts memberships from companies that deal with business closely related to gold or silver bullion in the London market. Members pay between £5,000 and £12,000 annually depending on membership type. LBMA members come from Australia, Belgium, Canada, China, Germany, Hong Kong, India, Italy, Japan, Kazakhstan, Luxembourg, Mexico, Netherlands, Poland, Russian Federation, South Africa, Switzerland, Taiwan, Turkey, United Arab Emirates, United States, and Uzbekistan. A full membership in the LBMA enables members to expand operations internationally, like it did for VTB Bank, for example. VTB, a Russian-based bank, joined in 2015 as the first full member from Russia and was able to begin expanding into Asian emerging markets as a result.

== LBMA forecast ==
Each year the LBMA forecast gathers the opinions of selected bankers, traders and analysts who follow the precious metals markets with their forecasts for the high, low and average dollar fixing price per troy ounce for gold, silver, platinum and palladium. The aim of the LBMA forecast is to predict the average, high and low price for each metal as accurately as possible. The prediction closest to the average price wins. In the event of a tie, the forecast range is taken into account. In the 2009 LBMA forecast, Philip Klapwijk took the prize for most accurate forecaster for both gold and silver prices.

== Other London markets ==
The London bullion market is distinct from the London Metal Exchange (LME). The latter is the futures exchange with the world's largest market in options and futures contracts on base and other metals.

== See also ==
- Gold as an investment
- Silver as an investment
- Bullion
- London Platinum and Palladium Market
- Good Delivery
