= Philip Klapwijk =

British economist

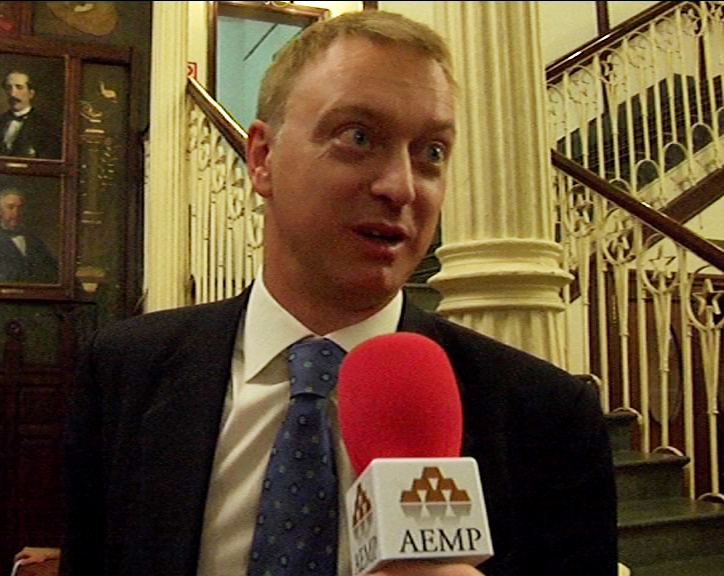
- Klapwijk in 2010
- Born: Philip Andrew Klapwijk
- Education: London School of Economics; College of Europe
- Occupation: Economist

Philip Andrew Klapwijk is a British economist in precious metals commodities markets.

== Education ==
He studied at the London School of Economics and the College of Europe in Bruges where he obtained degrees in economics.

== Career ==
Following his studies, he started work as an analyst with Gold Fields Mineral Services (now GFMS). Following the management buyout of GFMS in 1988 with Paul Walker and Hester le Roux he became Executive Chairman and Global Head of Metals Analytics. In 2011 GFMS became part of Thomson Reuters.

After leaving GFMS Philip Klapwijk became Managing Director of Precious Metals Insights Limited, a Hong Kong–based precious metals consultancy company. In the 2009 London bullion market LBMA Forecast Philip Klapwijk was awarded the prizes for the year's most accurate economic forecaster for both gold and silver prices and was the LBMA first prize winner for most accurate platinum forecast for 2014.
