= London Metal Exchange =

Futures exchange in London, England

Coordinates: 51°31′16″N 0°5′15″W

- Formation: 1877; 149 years ago
- Purpose: Trading in metals and metals-related contracts
- Owner: Hong Kong Exchanges and Clearing
- Website: lme.com

The London Metal Exchange (LME) is a futures and forwards exchange in London, United Kingdom with the world's largest market in standardised forward contracts, futures contracts and options on base metals. The exchange also offers contracts on ferrous metals and precious metals. The company also allows for cash trading. It offers hedging, worldwide reference pricing, and the option of physical delivery to settle contracts.

== Overview ==
=== Ring trading ===
Trading times are 11:40 to 17:00.

The LME is the last exchange in Europe where open-outcry trading takes place. The ring was temporarily closed in March 2020 due to the COVID-19 pandemic. In January 2021, LME proposed closing the ring, Europe's last open-outcry trading floor, and moving permanently to an electronic system. However, the ring reopened in September of the same year after resistance from members.

In addition to the 9 companies that have exclusive rights to trade in the ring, around 100 companies are involved in the LME in total.

=== Precious metals ===
The LME used, however, to provide trade matching and clearing services to the London bullion market and distributes gold, silver, and gold IRS (interest rate swaps) forward rates on behalf of the LBMA.

=== Electronic trading ===
The LME launched an electronic platform called LME Select launched in February 2001. This was developed by a Swedish software house Cinnober. The platform is a FIX-based trading platform, and now handles a majority of the total LME business.

=== LME Clear ===
LME Clear is the clearing house for the London Metal Exchange. Launched in 2014 it was designed and built in consultation with the market to provide cost-efficient, EMIR compliant clearing and settlement services, using cutting-edge technology. LME Clear has announced the appointment of David Warren as Chairman effective July 20, 2023. David will succeed Marco Strimer, who will step down as chairman at the end of his term of office.

== History ==
LME can trace its history to metals trading in Royal Exchange, London.

It was purchased by Hong Kong Exchanges and Clearing in 2012.

In March 2022, LME was sued by Elliott Management, an American hedge fund. The hedge fund sued for $456 million, claiming that LME acted "unreasonably and irrationally" when it cancelled nickel trades made on 8 March, 2022. Jane Street Global Trading also sued LME for $15.3 million over its cancelled nickel trades in March. Both lawsuits were filed in the High Court of Justice. In November 2023, the court ruled in LME's favor, with Elliott and Jane Street appealing the decision to the Court of Appeals.

In March 2025, the Financial Conduct Authority fined the London Metal Exchange £9.2 million after it failed to prevent extreme volatility in the nickel market in March 2022.

== See also ==
- List of futures exchanges
- London Platinum and Palladium Market
