= Washington Agreement on Gold =

The Washington Agreement on Gold was signed on 26 September 1999 in Washington, D.C. during the International Monetary Fund (IMF) annual meeting, and the US Secretary of the Treasury, Lawrence Summers, and the Chairman of the Federal Reserve, Alan Greenspan, were present. The second version of the agreement was signed in 2004, the agreement was extended in 2009.

== Scope ==
"Under the agreement, the European Central Bank (ECB), the 11 national central banks of nations then participating in the new European currency, plus those of Sweden, Switzerland and the United Kingdom, agreed that gold should remain an important element of global monetary reserves and to limit their sales to no more than 400 tonnes (12.9 million oz) annually over the five years September 1999 to September 2004, being 2,000 tonnes (64.5 million oz) in all."

== Reason ==
"The agreement came in response to concerns in the gold market after the United Kingdom treasury announced that it was proposing to sell 58% of UK gold reserves through Bank of England auctions, coupled with the prospect of significant sales by the Swiss National Bank and the possibility of on-going sales by Austria and the Netherlands, plus proposals of sales by the IMF. The UK announcement, in particular, had greatly unsettled the market because, unlike most other European sales by central banks in recent years, it was announced in advance. Sales by such countries as Belgium and the Netherlands had always been discreet and announced after the event. So the Washington/European Agreement was at least perceived as putting a cap on European sales."

== Criticism ==
=== Legal status ===
- The agreement is not an international treaty, as defined and governed by international law.
- The agreement is a sui generis, gentlemen’s agreement among Central Bankers, of doubtful legality given the objectives and public law nature of Central Banks.
- The agreement resembles a cartel that materially affects the supply of gold in the global market. In this regard, the agreement stretches the borders of antitrust legislation.

=== Public participation ===
- The agreement was negotiated behind closed doors. Information was not provided to the public and relevant stakeholders were not afforded the opportunity to comment.
- The agreement does not contain formal mechanisms for re-negotiation. Trends in international law regarding public participation and access to information should inform the re-negotiation process, scheduled for 2004.

=== Analysis ===
The following remarks are from George Milling-Stanley, Manager, Gold Market Analysis--World Gold Council, from an October 6, 1999, address to The 12th Nikkei Gold Conference :

"Central bank independence is enshrined in law in many countries, and central bankers tend to be independent thinkers. It is worth asking why such a large group of them decided to associate themselves with this highly unusual agreement...At the same time, through our close contacts with central banks, the Council has been aware that some of the biggest holders have for some time been concerned about the impact on the gold price—and thus on the value of their gold reserves—of unfounded rumours, and about the use of official gold for speculative purposes.

"Several of the central bankers involved had said repeatedly they had no intention of selling any of their gold, but they had been saying that as individuals—and no-one had taken any notice. I think that is what Mr. Duisenberg meant when he said they were making this statement to clarify their intentions."

== The documents ==
=== First version (1999) ===
The first version, the Central Bank Gold Agreement (CBGA) was signed on 26 September 1999.

It states:

1. Gold will remain an important element of global monetary reserves.
2. The above institutions will not enter the market as sellers, with the exception of already decided sales.
3. The gold sales already decided will be achieved through a concerted programme of sales over the next five years. Annual sales will not exceed approximately 400 tonnes and total sales over this period will not exceed 2,000 tonnes.
4. The signatories to this agreement have agreed not to expand their gold leasings and their use of gold futures and options over this period.
5. This agreement will be reviewed after five years.

==== Signatories ====
- Österreichische Nationalbank
- Banca d'Italia
- Banque de France
- Banco de Portugal
- Schweizerische Nationalbank
- Banque Nationale de Belgique
- Banque Centrale du Luxembourg
- Deutsche Bundesbank
- Banco de España
- Bank of England
- Suomen Pankki
- De Nederlandsche Bank
- Central Bank of Ireland
- Sveriges Riksbank
- European Central Bank

=== Second version (2004) ===
The second version, Joint Statement on Gold, was signed on 8 March 2004. The Bank of England did not participate.

==== Full text ====
In the interest of clarifying their intentions with respect to their gold holdings, the undersigned institutions make the following statement:

Gold will remain an important element of global monetary reserves.

The gold sales already decided and to be decided by the undersigned institutions will be achieved through a concerted programme of sales over a period of five years, starting on 27 September 2004, just after the end of the previous agreement. Annual sales will not exceed 500 tons and total sales over this period will not exceed 2,500 tons.

Over this period, the signatories to this agreement have agreed that the total amount of their gold leasings and the total amount of their use of gold futures and options will not exceed the amounts prevailing at the date of the signature of the previous agreement. This agreement will be reviewed after five years.

==== Signatories ====
- European Central Bank
- Banca d'Italia
- Banco de España
- Banco de Portugal
- Bank of Greece
- Banque Centrale du Luxembourg
- Banque de France
- Banque Nationale de Belgique
- Central Bank & Financial Services Authority of Ireland
- De Nederlandsche Bank
- Deutsche Bundesbank
- Österreichische Nationalbank
- Suomen Pankki
- Schweizerische Nationalbank
- Sveriges Riksbank

=== 2009 agreement ===
In August 2009, 19 banks extended the agreement and committed to selling no more than a combined 400 metric tonnes of gold through September 2014. The International Monetary Fund did not sign this agreement.

==== Full text ====
1. Gold remains an important element of global monetary reserves.

2. The gold sales already decided and to be decided by the undersigned institutions will be achieved through a concerted programme of sales over a period of five years, starting on 27 September 2009, immediately after the end of the previous agreement. Annual sales will not exceed 400 tonnes and total sales over this period will not exceed 2,000 tonnes.

3. The signatories recognize the intention of the IMF to sell 403 tonnes of gold and noted that such sales can be accommodated within the above ceilings.

4. This agreement will be reviewed after five years.

=== 2019 lapsing of the agreement ===
Having renewed the agreement for a fourth 5-year term in 2014, in 2019 the signatory banks agreed not to renew the agreement again, on the justification that they had not sold large amounts of gold in some time. Their sales had in fact declined from near the agreed limit in 2007 to nearly zero in 2012 and had remained very low thereafter.

== See also ==
- Gold Standard
- Fractional-reserve banking
