= Bullion =

Gold, silver, or other precious metals in the form of bars or ingots

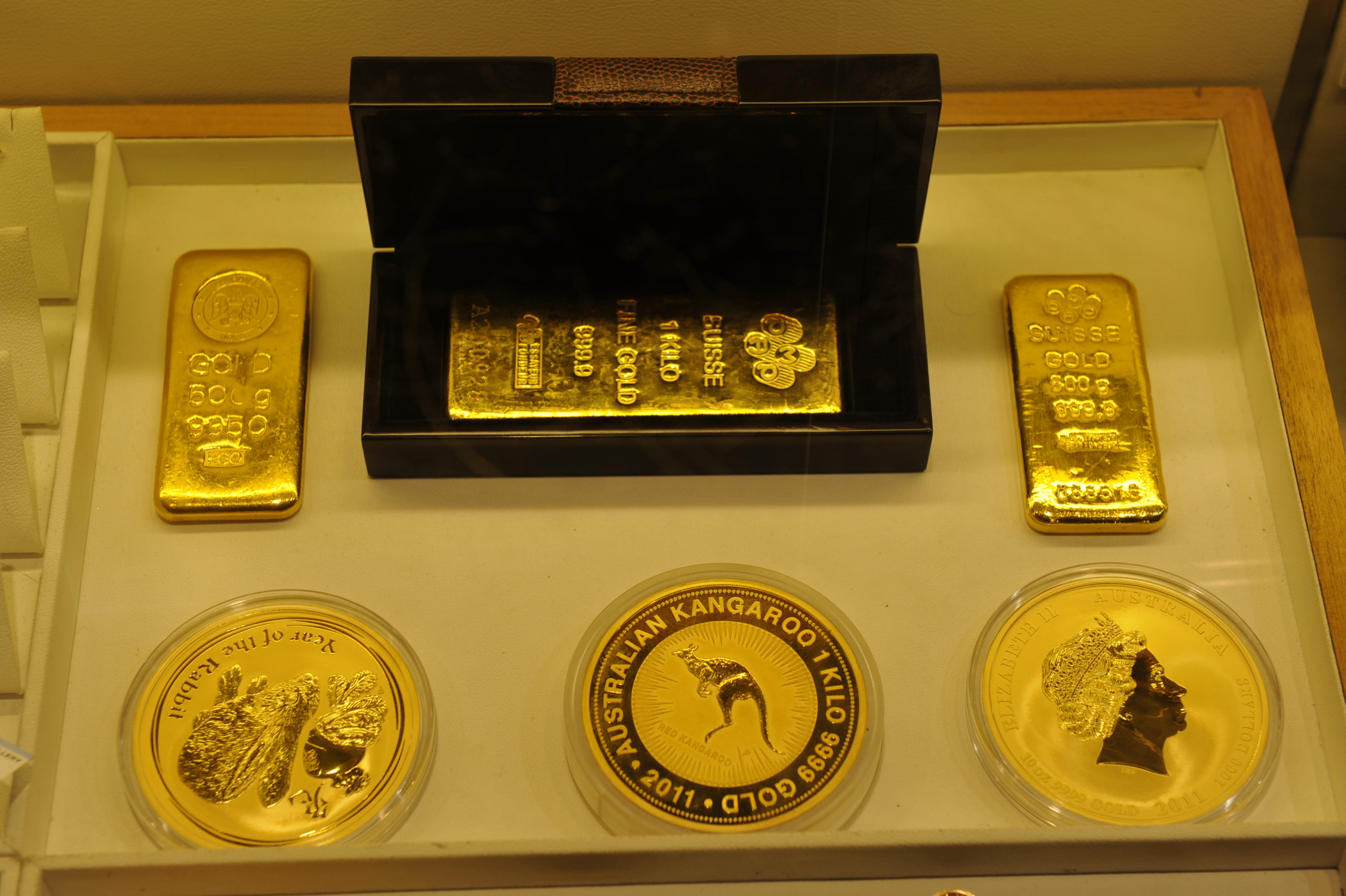
Gold bullion bars and coins

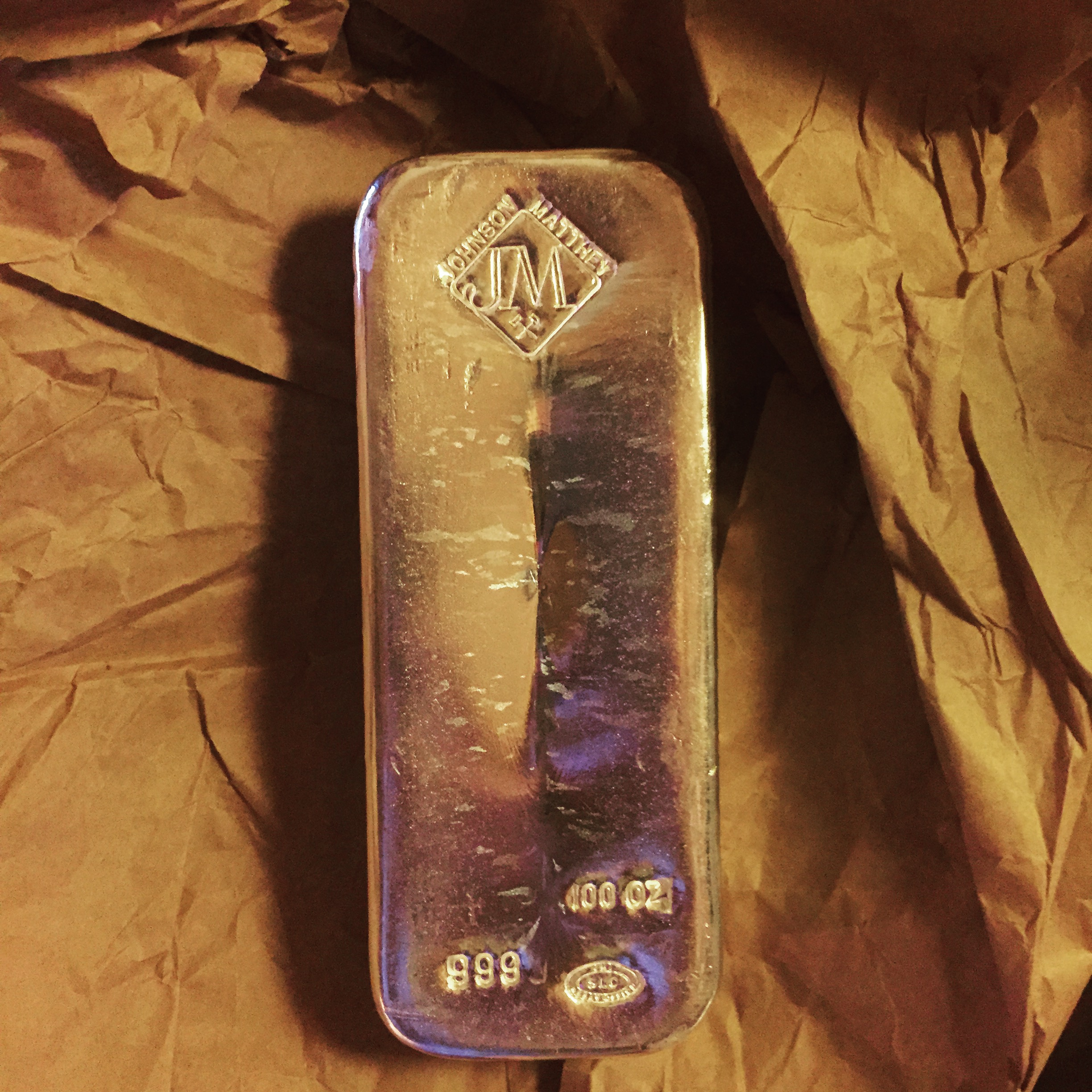
100 troy ounces (3.110 kg) silver bullion cast by Johnson Matthey, PLC

Bullion is non-ferrous metal that has been refined to a high standard of elemental purity. The term is ordinarily applied to bulk metal used in the production of coins and especially to precious metals such as gold and silver. It comes from the Anglo-Norman term for a melting-house where metal was refined, and earlier from French bouillon, "boiling". Although precious metal bullion is no longer used to make coins for general circulation, it continues to be held as an investment with a reputation for stability in periods of economic uncertainty. To assess the purity of gold bullion, the centuries-old technique of fire assay is still employed, together with modern spectroscopic instrumentation, to accurately determine its quality.

Bullion is sometimes contrasted with specie, the latter being coin made of bullion (or synonymously, bullion coin). Thus understood, bullion refers to precious metal kept in forms other than coin, namely bars, ingots, or plates, including regional and historical variants such as grivnas in Eastern Europe or sycees in China.

== As investment ==
The specifications of bullion are often regulated by market bodies or legislation. In the European Union, the minimum purity for gold to be referred to as "bullion", which is treated as investment gold with regard to taxation, is 99.5% for gold bullion bars and 90% for bullion coins. Investors may choose to purchase physical bullion for several reasons –to attempt to hedge against currency risks, inflation risks, or geopolitical risks, or even just to add diversification to an investment portfolio.

== London bullion market ==
The London bullion market is an over-the-counter market for wholesale trading of gold and silver. The London Bullion Market Association (LBMA) coordinates activities of its members and other participants in the London bullion market. The LBMA sets and promotes quality standards for gold and silver bullion bars. The minimum acceptable fineness of the Good Delivery Bars is 99.5% for gold bars and 99.9% for silver bars. Bars with a purity less than these may not be referred to as "bullion".

== Coins ==
Bullion coins, also known as specie, are coins made of bullion. In modern use, they are minted by official agencies for investment or collecting purposes. Some bullion coins have been used as currency throughout the 20th century, such as the Maria Theresa thaler and the Krugerrand. Modern bullion coins generally do not enter common circulation despite having legal tender status and nominal face value. Some modern bullion coins are produced as business strike and collectible proof and uncirculated versions, such as the American Silver Eagle and American Gold Eagle coins. Private mint strikes, that look similar to coins but are not legal tender for any country, called bullion rounds, bullion wafers or bullion bars are typically sold at prices slightly above the underlying prevailing precious metals spot price commensurate with their precious metal content, whereas collectible versions are sold at a significant premium over their precious metal bullion melt value. In some cases, the grade and mintages of privately struck rounds, bars or wafers can affect their value as a collectible, as they can be considered collectible numismatic pieces rather than bullion items.

== Uses ==
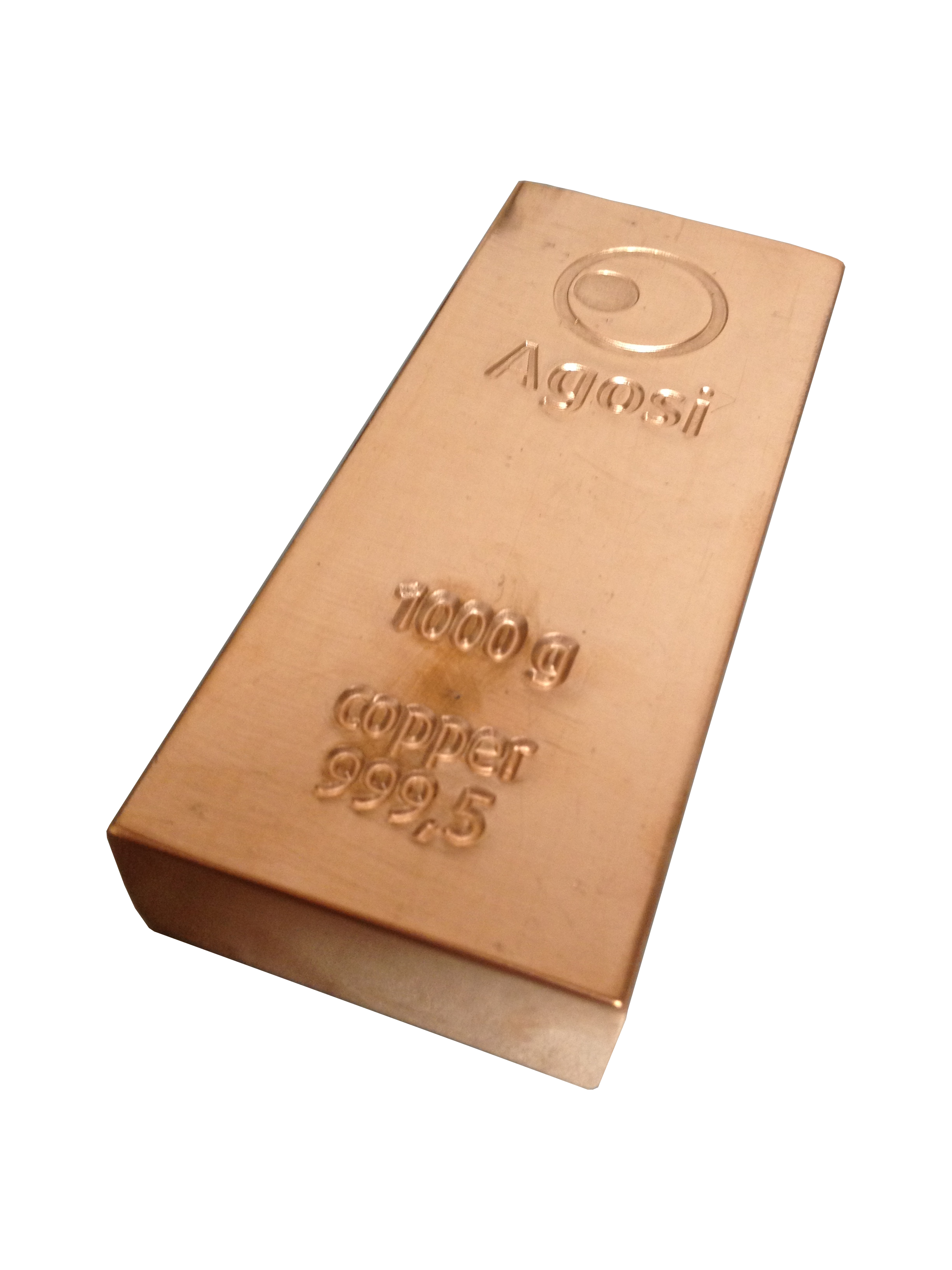
Base metals such as copper are refined (here at 99.95% purity) into bullion for industrial or educational use rather than investment.

Professional market participants participate in the bullion markets, such as banks, fabricators, refiners, and vault operators or transport companies, as well as brokers. They provide facilities for the refining, melting, assaying, transporting, trading and vaulting of gold and silver bullion. Other professional parties such as investment companies and jewelers use bullion in the context of products or services which they produce or offer to customers. Shares of the world's largest gold exchange-traded fund, the SPDR Gold Shares, represent a gold spot price mimicking derivative although shareholders in popular gold ETFs such as GLD are almost always unsecured creditors, meaning they own no vaulted gold bullion potentially underlying the exchange-traded fund (ETF).

Investors often prefer to own bullion outright over ETFs for to the minimization of inherent counter-party risk. Private individuals use bullion as an investment or as a store of value. Gold bullion and silver bullion are the most important forms of physical precious metals investments. Bullion investments can be considered as insurance against inflation or economic turmoil, their sole direct counterparty risk being theft or government confiscation. Compared to numismatic coins, bullion bars or bullion coins can typically be purchased and traded at lower price premiums over the fluctuating spot price and their trading bid/ask spreads or buy/sell price differences are closer to the values of the contained precious metals.

== See also ==
- Bullion coin
- Bullionism
- Official United States bullion coins
- Gold as an investment
- Inflation hedge
- Ingot
- List of bullion dealers
- West Point Mint
