= London Platinum and Palladium Market =

- Type: Commodities exchange (over-the-counter)
- Location: London, England, UK
- Founded: 1973; 53 years ago
- Currency: United States dollar
- Website: www.lppm.com

The London Platinum and Palladium Market (LPPM) is an over-the-counter trading centre for platinum and palladium and a commodity trading association. London has always been a centre for the research in and development of most of the platinum group metals. Trade was established in the early 20th century, typically by existing dealers of gold and silver. The LPPM has been involved in fixing the world market prices of platinum and palladium since 1989.

== History ==
Trading on the London Platinum and Palladium Market has a much shorter history than the trading on the London Bullion Market, which is performed since the 17th century. London has been a historically important centre for platinum and palladium. The trading was initiated at the beginning of the 20th century, alongside the longer-established bullion metals.

In 1973, metal dealers established "London Platinum and Palladium Quotation"—a forerunner of the fixings. The prices for platinum and palladium were settled twice a day on the spot market.

In 1979, leading dealers from London and Zurich signed an agreement to standardize the origin and specifications of the metals of the good delivery quality.

On 5 May 1987, the London Platinum and Palladium Market was established with close assistance by the Bank of England, which was the regulator of the precious metals market at that time. Currently, the primary regulatory authority in the UK is the Financial Services Authority.

In 1989, the quotations of platinum and palladium were expanded to full-fledged fixings.

== Price determination ==
Twice per working day, the platinum and palladium fixings are set via telephone calls:

- Morning: Monday to Friday, at 9:45 UTC (10:45 CET)
- Afternoon: Monday to Friday, at 14:00 UTC (15:00 CET).

== Members ==
=== Full members ===
- BASF Metals
- Goldman Sachs International
- Heraeus Metals Germany GmbH & Co. KG
- HSBC Bank USA NA London Branch
- ICBC Standard Bank PLC
- Johnson Matthey
- JP Morgan Chase Bank
- Metalor Technologies
- Mitsui & Co Precious Metals Inc (London Branch)
- PAMP SA
- Standard Chartered Bank
- Tanaka Kikinzoku Kogyo
- The Bank of Nova Scotia
- UBS AG
- Valcambi

== Trading ==
Twice each working day, four LPPM members (banks, producers, refiners, fabricators, manufacturers and distributors) fix the bid prices. The bid price is one at which members of LPPM guarantee that they will buy good delivery metal. The bid prices for the metals are benchmarks for the market and therefore for the industry. The bid prices, in turn, affect the offer prices that customers are asked to pay for metal. The market values of the metals, as is the case for all commodities, ultimately affect manufacturing costs. Unlike a futures exchange, an OTC market offers some flexibility and confidentiality of transactions carried out between two entities. Many transactions are speculative; only a fraction of deals are closed via a physical delivery.

== See also ==
- London Metal Exchange
- Platinum as an investment
- Palladium as an investment
