= Good Delivery =

Bullion specification

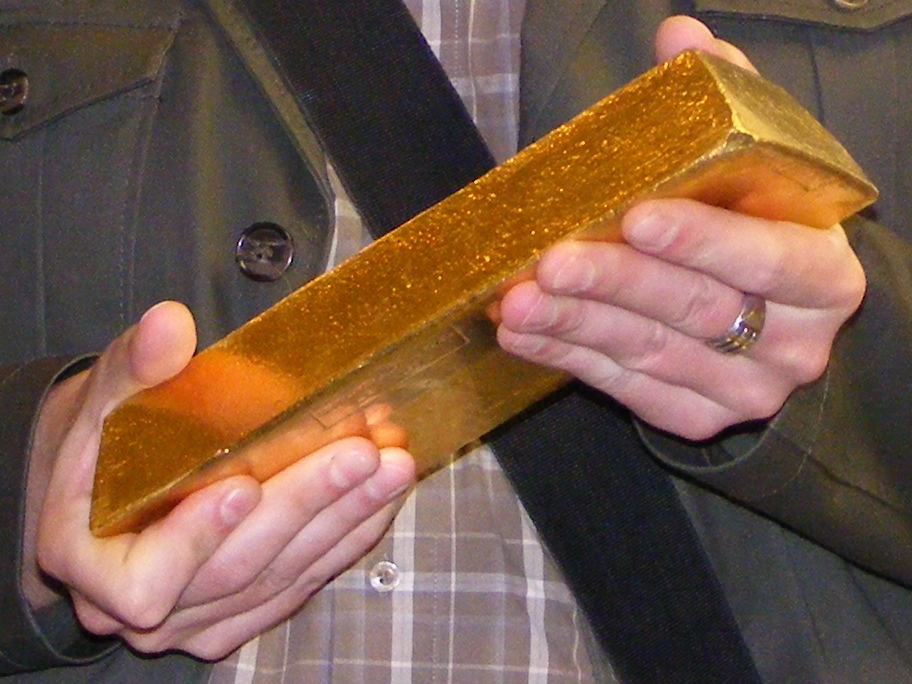
Good Delivery gold bar weighing 12.4 kilograms (400 ozt)

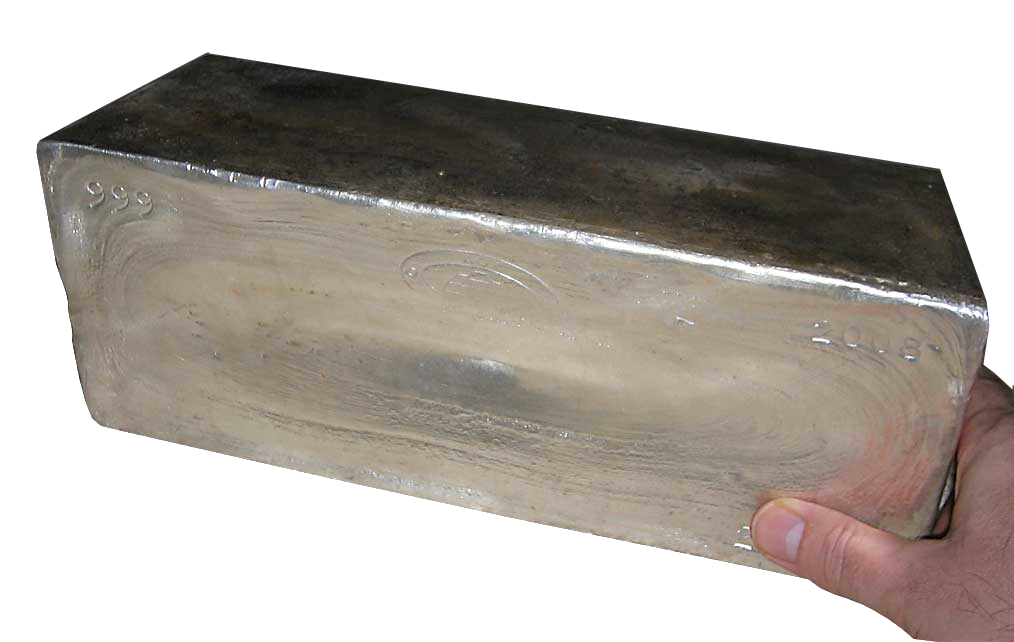
Good Delivery silver bar weighing 31.1 kilograms (1,000 ozt)

The Good Delivery specification is a set of rules issued by the London Bullion Market Association (LBMA) describing the physical characteristics of gold and silver bars used in settlement in the wholesale London bullion market. It also puts forth requirements for listing on the LBMA Good Delivery List of approved refineries.

Good Delivery bars are notable for their large size and high purity. They are known for their distinctive trapezoidal prism, a product of the mould which helps create a uniform production and consistent sloped faces, referred to as a draft or undercut.

== The Good Delivery Rules for Gold and Silver Bars ==
The entire Good Delivery specification is contained in the LBMA document titled The Good Delivery Rules for Gold and Silver Bars: Specifications for Good Delivery Bars and Application Procedures for Listing. The document includes specific requirements regarding the fineness, weight, dimensions, appearance, marks, and production of gold and silver bars. It specifies procedures for weighing, packing, and delivery. It also describes policies for ensuring refiners' compliance with the specifications.

The current edition of the Good Delivery Rules was published in January 2026.

== Basic specifications ==
=== Gold bars ===
- Fineness: minimum of 995.0 parts per thousand fine gold
- Marks: serial number, refiner's hallmark, fineness, year of manufacture
- Gold content: 350–430 troy ounces (11–13 kg)
- Recommended dimensions
  - Length (top): 210–290 millimetres (8.3–11.4 inches)
  - Width (top): 55–85 millimetres (2.2–3.3 inches)
  - Height: 25–45 millimetres (0.98–1.77 inches)

=== Silver bars ===
- Fineness: minimum of 999.0 parts per thousand silver
- Marks: serial number, refiner's hallmark, fineness, year of manufacture
- Silver content: 900–1,100 troy ounces (28–34 kg) from January 1, 2025 on; 750–1,100 troy ounces (23–34 kg) for Bars manufactured after January 1, 2008; 500–1,250 troy ounces (16–39 kg) for Bars manufactured prior to January 1, 2008
- Recommended dimensions
  - Length (top): 250–350 millimetres (9.8–13.8 inches)
  - Width (top): 110–150 millimetres (4.3–5.9 inches)
  - Height: 60–100 millimetres (2.4–3.9 inches)

Weight is not recommended to be stamped on bars of either gold or silver, because bars will be officially weighed on delivery, and this weight, which may be different from that originally marked, will prevail. A bar's weight may also change by handling or sampling, thus invalidating the original mark.

== Non–Good Delivery ==
Bars that do not comply with Good Delivery rules are termed Non–Good Delivery. If they are similar to Good Delivery bars but do not fully meet the requirements, they must be stamped with "NGD" to distinguish them from conforming bars.

== LBMA Good Delivery List ==
The LBMA maintains two Good Delivery Lists of approved refineries (one for gold and one for silver) that meet certain minimum criteria (age, net worth, and production volume) and have demonstrated their ability to produce Good Delivery bars. Listed companies agree to submit to monitoring by the LBMA. Those listed companies that refuse to participate in regular monitoring are removed from the Good Delivery List and added to the Former List.

== Good Delivery Referees ==
Seven companies are accredited by the LBMA as Good Delivery Referees in order to supervise the Good Delivery System and monitor the companies with Good Delivery certification. The referees' main functions are:

- Technical assessment of applicants for listing
- Anonymous proactive monitoring of refiners on the Good Delivery List
- Provision of technical advice on a range of topics

The companies accredited as referees are:

- Argor-Heraeus SA (Switzerland)
- Metalor Technologies SA (Switzerland)
- MKS PAMP SA (Switzerland)
- Rand Refinery (PTY) Ltd (South Africa)
- Tanaka Kikinzoku Kogyo K.K. (Japan)
- Agosi AG (Germany)
- Gold Corporation (T/A The Perth Mint) (Australia)

== See also ==
- Doré bar
- Gold as an investment
- Gold bar
- Gold reserve
- Gold standard
- Inflation hedge
- London Platinum and Palladium Market
- Palladium as an investment
- Platinum as an investment
- Refining (metallurgy)
- Silver as an investment
- Silver standard
