= Gold reserve =

State-held stockpile of gold bullion

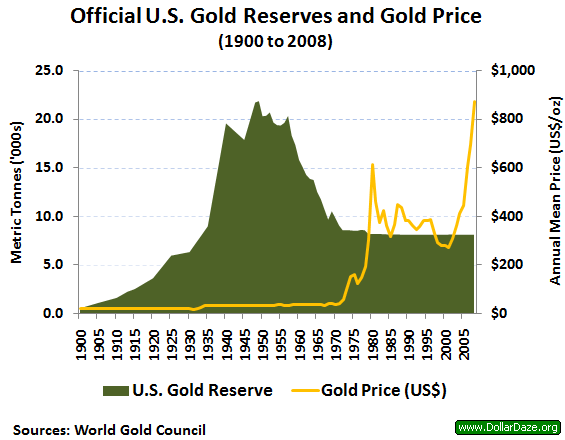
Official U.S. gold reserve since 1900

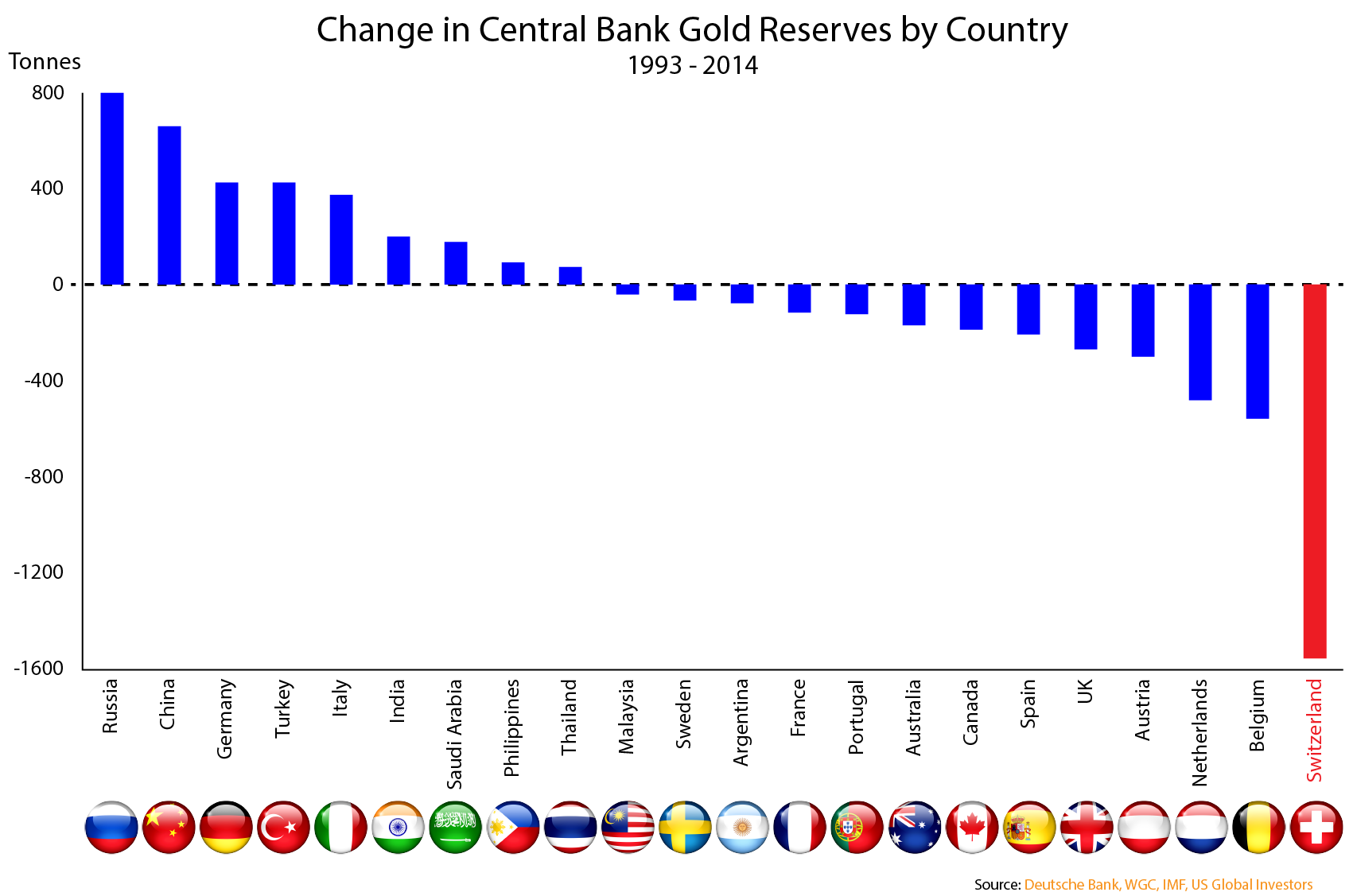
Changes in central bank gold reserves by country 1993–2014

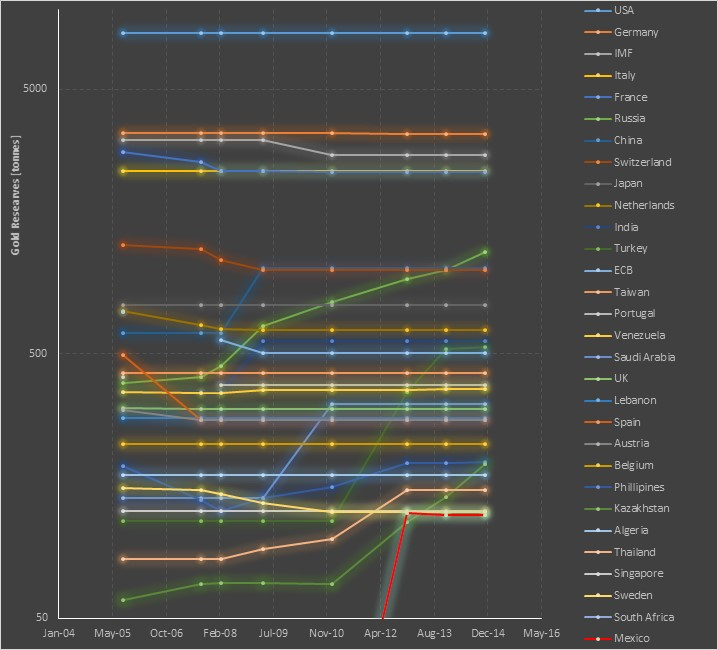
Central 2005 and 2014

A gold reserve is the gold held by a national central bank, mostly in a country, intended mainly as a guarantee to redeem promises to pay depositors, note holders (e.g. paper money), or trading peers, during the eras of the gold standard, and also as a store of value, or to support the value of the national currency.

The World Gold Council estimates that all the gold ever mined, and that is accounted for, totalled 190,040 tonnes in 2019 but other independent estimates vary by as much as 20%. At the price of $144 per gram reached on 25 December 2025, one tonne of gold has a value of approximately $144 million. The total value of all gold ever mined, and that is accounted for, would exceed $27 trillion at that valuation and using WGC 2017 estimates. (Note: One tonne is equal to approximately 32,150.75 troy ounces. Gold, silver, and other precious metals and gems are weighed by the troy ounce: 12 troy ounces = 1 troy pound (and not 16 to 1 as in the avoirdupois weight system))

== IMF holdings ==
Since early 2011, the gold holdings of the IMF have been constant at 2,814.1 tonnes (90.5 million troy ounces).

== Officially reported holdings ==
The IMF regularly maintains statistics of national assets as reported by various countries. This data is used by the World Gold Council to periodically rank and report the gold holdings of countries and official organizations.

On 17 July 2015, China announced that it increased its gold reserves by about 57 percent from 1,054 to 1,658 tonnes, while disclosing its official gold reserves for the first time in six years.

In July 2015, the State Bank of Vietnam stated that gold reserves totalled 10 tonnes. However, it was not ranked below due to the current absence of any published data.

In 2019, the State Oil Fund of the Republic of Azerbaijan (SOFAZ) extended the gold allocation limit from 5% to 10%, in accordance with the amendments made to the Investment Policy of the Fund for diversification purposes. However, the Central Bank of Azerbaijan does not hold any gold.

The gold listed for each of the countries in the table may not be physically stored in the country listed, as central banks generally have not allowed independent audits of their reserves. Gold leasing by central banks could place into doubt the reported gold holdings in the table below.

Note that while Russian gold reserves are listed as 2,332.7 tonnes, of the 405.7 tonnes held by the National Wealth Fund at the beginning of the war, only 173.1 remained as of November 2025. From November Russia started selling physical NWF gold on the internal gold market, whereas it had previously sold it to the Central Bank, to maintain NWF liquidity while preserving physical reserves.

In September 2026, De Nederlandsche Bank (DNB) reported that approximately 86 tonnes of gold had been transferred from the United States and Canada to London between March and August 2026. Following the relocation, London held 32.1% of DNB's gold reserves, while New York and Ottawa each held 18.5%. DNB said the transfer was intended to improve the tradability of its reserves and strengthen its crisis preparedness amid increasing geopolitical unrest. The total size of DNB's gold reserve remained unchanged at 612.4 tonnes.

Top 50 countries by gold reserves (as of Q3/ October 2026)
Rank	Country/Organization	Gold holdings (tonnes)	Gold's share of forex reserves
1	United States	8,133	83.8%
2	Germany	3,349	84.0%
—	International Monetary Fund	2,814	— (Note: BIS and IMF balance sheets do not allow this percentage to be calculated.)
3	Italy	2,452	80.6%
4	France	2,437	81.8%
5	China	2,435	9.5%
6	Russia	2,264	40.6%
7	Switzerland	1,040	15.1%
8	India	881	18.1%
9	Japan	846	9.1%
10	Poland	700	31.9%
11	Netherlands	612	74.2%
12	Turkey	532	56.3%
—	European Central Bank	507	56.2%
13	Uzbekistan	432	87.4%
14	Taiwan	424	%
15	Portugal	383	79.9 %
16	Kazakhstan	382	77.7%
17	Saudi Arabia	323	10.7%
18	United Kingdom	310	21.1%
19	Lebanon	287	82.1%
20	Spain	282	33.8%
21	Austria	280	75.3%
22	Thailand	235	12.7%
23	Belgium	227	59.1%
24	Singapore	204	65.4%
25	Azerbaijan	178	38.2%
26	Iraq	176	24.8%
27	Algeria	174	34.8%
28	Brazil	172	75.09%
29	Libya	147	20.4%
30	Philippines	134	18.6%
31	Egypt	130	38.2%
32	Sweden	126	24.8%
33	South Africa	126	23.2%
34	Mexico	120	63.6%
35	Qatar	116	30.3%
36	Greece	115	69.5%
37	Hungary	110	24.1%
38	South Korea	104	32.3%
39	Romania	103	16.6%
—	Bank for International Settlements	102.0 (Note: Excluding any gold held in connection with swap operations, under which the bank exchanges currencies for physical gold. The bank has an obligation to return this gold at the end of the contract.)	—
40	Indonesia	87	87.7%
41	Czech Republic	82	65.39%
42	Australia	80	16.7%
43	Kuwait	79	23.7%
44	United Arab Emirates	75	43.17%
45	Jordan	73	41.5%
46	Denmark	67	82.3%
47	Pakistan	65	35.1%
48	Argentina	62	21.8%
49	Serbia	55.0	22.6%
50	Cambodia	54	27.7%
—	World	36,535.4 (Note: World total as calculated by the IMF. This will not equal the total for the countries in the table as ‘World total’ will include data for countries beyond the top 100 and for countries that do not publish their reserves. World total also captures BIS holdings inclusive of swap operations.)	29.2%
—	Euro area (including the ECB)	10,808	74.2%

- Notes

== See also ==
- Gold Reserve Inc.
- Gold as an investment
- Federal Reserve Bank of New York
- Foreign exchange reserves
- Inflation hedge
- List of countries by gold production
- Moscow Gold, the reserves of the Bank of Spain sent to the Soviet Union during the Spanish Civil War
- Romanian Treasure, the Romanian gold reserves sent (alongside other valuable objects) to Russia for safekeeping during World War I, but never returned
- Silver as an investment
- Strategic Petroleum Reserve (United States)
- United States Bullion Depository, often known as Fort Knox
- Vaulted gold
- Gold repatriation
