= ETF Securities =

Australian asset management firm

- Company type: Private Limited
- Industry: Investment management
- Founder: Graham Tuckwell
- Number of locations: Sydney, Melbourne
- Products: Exchange-traded funds
- Website: www.etfsecurities.com.au

ETF Securities is an asset management firm that issues exchange-traded funds (ETFs) primarily in Australia.

== History ==
The company was founded by Australian businessman and philanthropist Graham Tuckwell.

The company worked with the World Gold Council on the development of the first gold ETF in 2003 and collaborated on the listing of Gold Bullion Securities on the London Stock Exchange in March 2004.

In 2003, the company listed the first physically-backed gold exchange-traded commodity (ETC) on the Australian Securities Exchange.

In 2005, the company created Europe's first petroleum ETF and in 2006 established the world's first commodities ETF platform, making 19 commodities and 10 commodity indices available on the London Stock Exchange and other European exchanges.

In 2008, the company listed the first carbon ETF on the London Stock Exchange.

In September 2008, the company launched ETF Exchange, a trading platform in Europe.

The company launched an exchange-traded currencies software platform in November 2009.

By November 2012, the company had $30 billion in assets under management.

On 8 February 2013, the company was selected by Charles Schwab Corporation as the sole provider of its precious metal ETFs.

In March 2013, the company listed currency-hedged physical gold investment products on the London Stock Exchange and the Deutsche Börse.

In August 2013, the company began offering the world's first gold exchange-traded product (ETP) to allow physical redemption by retail and institutional investors.

In May 2014, the company partnered with E Fund Management (Hong Kong) Co., Limited to launch Europe's first ETF to track the MSCI China A Index, which gives foreign investors exposure to hard-to-invest-in A-shares.

In January 2015, the company launched two smart beta ETFs on the NYSE in partnership with ERI Scientific Beta, which attempt to use ERI Scientific Beta's stock selection process to produce higher risk-adjusted returns.

In April 2015, the company partnered with Bank Lombard Odier & Co to offer bond ETFs listed on the London Stock Exchange.

On 26 May 2015, the company formed a joint venture with the ANZ Bank to offer six new ETFs on the Australian Securities Exchange.

In April 2018, WisdomTree Investments acquired the company's European business and Standard Life Aberdeen acquired the company's U.S. business.
