= World Gold Council =

International trade association for the gold industry

- Formation: 1987 (39 years ago)
- Type: Trade association
- Legal status: Active
- Headquarters: London, United Kingdom
- Region served: Worldwide
- President: Kelvin Dushnisky
- CEO: David Tait
- Website: www.gold.org

The World Gold Council is an international trade association for the gold industry. It is headquartered in London and has offices in India, China, Singapore, the UAE and the United States. The organization's members are gold mining companies. David Harquail is its president and David Tait is the CEO. Its aim is stimulating and sustaining demand for gold through market development.

World Gold Council was founded in 1987 in a merger with South African company Intergold, inheriting its international offices. At the time imports of the South African Krugerrand had been banned in multiple countries to protest against South Africa's apartheid.

It publishes research advocating for gold, various products such as SPDR Gold Shares and gold accumulation plans in India and China, and films promoting its corporate activity.

== Controversies ==
The World Gold Council are one of the industry associations targeted by a Survival International campaign calling for companies to keep resources from uncontacted Indigenous peoples' lands out of their supply chains. The campaign was launched following the publication of a report in October 2025 that revealed that almost half of the world's uncontacted peoples would be wiped out if governments and companies didn't act. It was reported in Private Eye that the WGC had accused Survival International of launching a cyber attack after the industry association received emails from the public concerned about uncontacted peoples.
