= List of bullion dealers =

This list of bullion dealers includes notable companies and organizations that deal in precious metals, such as gold and silver.

Dealer	Country	Bullion							
Dealer	Country	Copper	Silver	Ruthenium	Iridium	Palladium	Gold	Platinum	Rhodium
Austrian Mint	Austria	check	check				check	check	
Baird & Co	United Kingdom		check			check	check	check	check
CBPMC	China		check				check		
Chards Coin and Bullion	United Kingdom		check			check	check	check	
DGSE Companies	United States		check			check	check	check	
Emirates Gold	United Arab Emirates		check				check		
Garfield Refining	United States		check			check	check	check	
Goldline International	United States		check			check	check	check	
Heraeus	Germany		check			check	check	check	
Johnson Matthey	United Kingdom		check			check	check	check	
Hungarian Mint	Hungary		check				check	check	
Kremnica Mint	Slovakia		check				check		
METALOR	Switzerland		check	check	check	check	check	check	check
MKS PAMP	Switzerland		check				check	check	
Monex Precious Metals	United States		check			check	check	check	
Pallion Group	Australia		check			check	check	check	
Perth Mint	Australia		check			check	check	check	
Rand Refinery	South Africa		check				check		
Royal Canadian Mint	Canada		check				check	check	
Royal Mint	United Kingdom		check				check	check	
Sharps Pixley	United Kingdom		check	check	check	check	check	check	
Singapore Mint	Singapore		check				check	check	
Tanaka Kikinzoku	Japan		check				check	check	
Texas Precious Metals	United States		check				check	check	
Umicore	Belgium		check	check	check	check	check	check	check
United States Mint	United States		check				check	check	
Valcambi	Switzerland		check			check	check	check	
