= Substance (chemistry) =

Form of matter

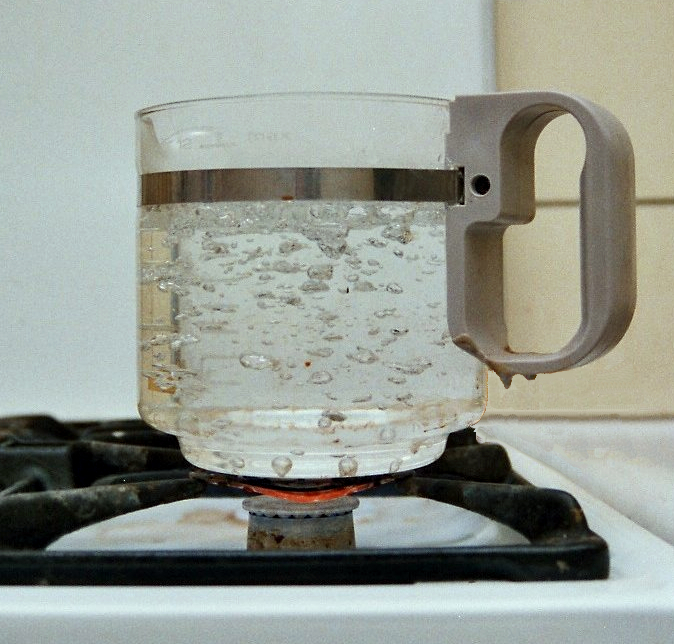
Steam and liquid water are two different forms of the same pure chemical substance, water.

Picture of a formed molecule

In chemistry, a substance is a unique form of matter with constant chemical composition and characteristic properties. Chemical substances may take the form of a single element or chemical compounds. If two or more chemical substances can be combined without reacting, they may form a chemical mixture. If a mixture is separated to isolate one chemical substance to a desired degree, the resulting substance is said to be chemically pure.

Chemical substances can exist in several different physical states or phases (e.g. solids, liquids, gases, or plasma) without changing their chemical composition. Substances transition between these phases of matter in response to changes in temperature or pressure. Some chemical substances can be combined or converted into new substances by means of chemical reactions. Chemicals that do not possess this ability are said to be inert.

Pure water is an example of a chemical substance, with a constant composition of two hydrogen atoms bonded to a single oxygen atom (i.e. H_{2}O). The atomic ratio of hydrogen to oxygen is always 2:1 in every molecule of water. Pure water will tend to boil near 100 °C (212 °F), an example of one of the characteristic properties that define it. Other notable chemical substances include diamond (a form of the element carbon), table salt (NaCl; an ionic compound), and refined sugar (C_{12}H_{22}O_{11}; an organic compound).

== Definitions ==
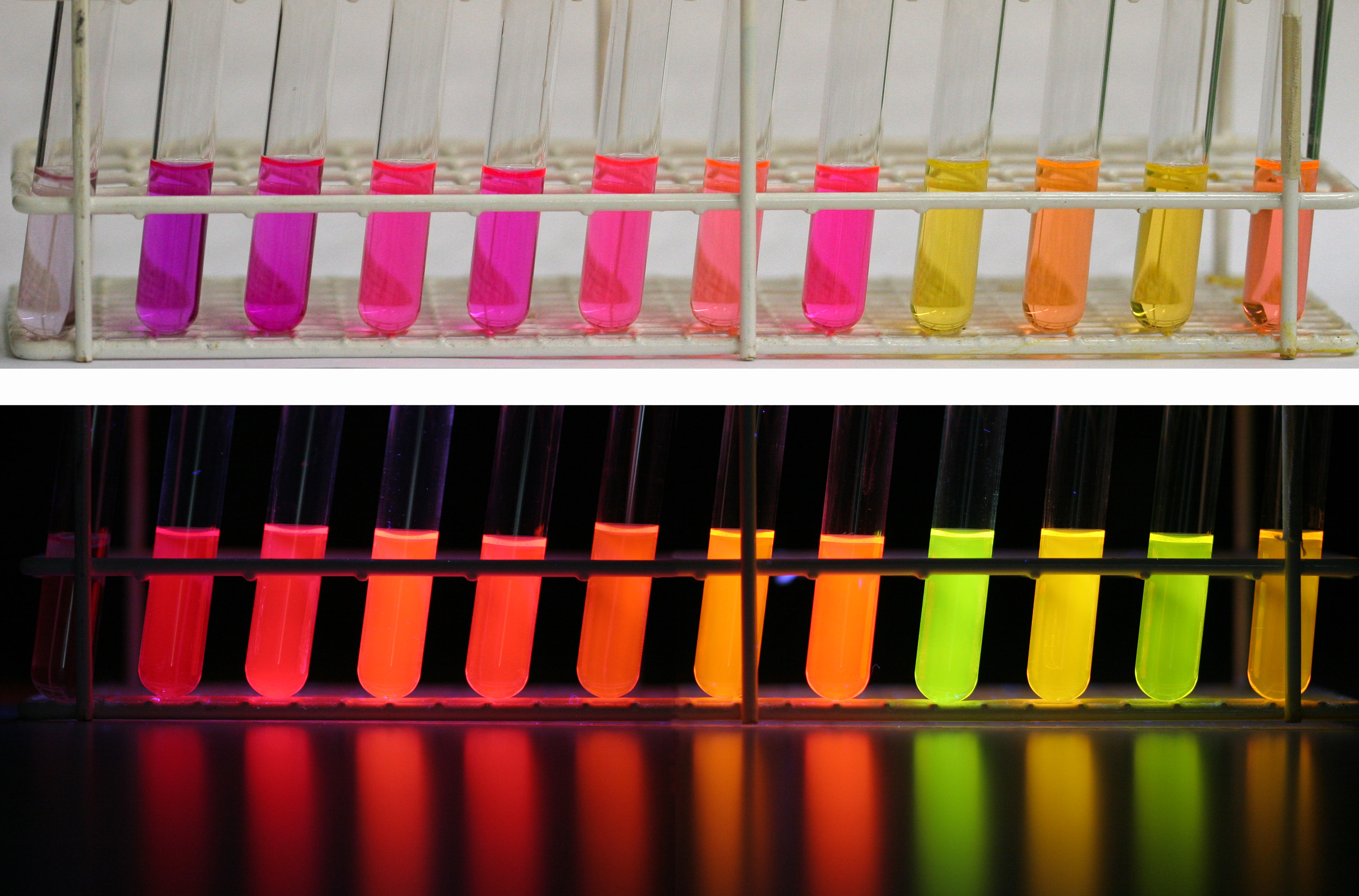
Colors of a single chemical (Nile red) in different solvents, under visible and UV light, showing how the chemical interacts dynamically with its solvent environment

In addition to the generic definition offered above, there are several niche fields where the term "chemical substance" may take alternate usages that are widely accepted, some of which are outlined in the sections below.

=== Inorganic chemistry ===
Chemical Abstracts Service (CAS) lists several alloys of uncertain composition within their chemical substance index. While an alloy could be more closely defined as a mixture, referencing them in the chemical substances index allows CAS to offer specific guidance on standard naming of alloy compositions. Non-stoichiometric compounds are another special case from inorganic chemistry, which violate the requirement for constant composition. For these substances, it may be difficult to draw the line between a mixture and a compound, as in the case of palladium hydride. Broader definitions of chemicals or chemical substances can be found, for example: "the term 'chemical substance' means any organic or inorganic substance of a particular molecular identity, including – (i) any combination of such substances occurring in whole or in part as a result of a chemical reaction or occurring in nature".

=== Geology ===
In the field of geology, inorganic solid substances of uniform composition are known as minerals. When two or more minerals are combined to form mixtures (or aggregates), they are defined as rocks. Many minerals, however, mutually dissolve into solid solutions, such that a single rock is a uniform substance despite being a mixture in stoichiometric terms. Feldspars are a common example: anorthoclase is an alkali aluminum silicate, where the alkali metal is interchangeably either sodium or potassium.

=== Law ===
In law, "chemical substances" may include both pure substances and mixtures with a defined composition or manufacturing process. For example, the EU regulation REACH defines "monoconstituent substances", "multiconstituent substances" and "substances of unknown or variable composition". The latter two consist of multiple chemical substances; however, their identity can be established either by direct chemical analysis or reference to a single manufacturing process. For example, charcoal is an extremely complex, partially polymeric mixture that can be defined by its manufacturing process. Therefore, although the exact chemical identity is unknown, identification can be made with a sufficient accuracy. The CAS Registry also includes mixtures.

=== Polymer chemistry ===
Polymers almost always appear as mixtures of molecules of multiple molar masses, each of which could be considered a separate chemical substance. However, the polymer may be defined by a known precursor or reaction(s) and the molar mass distribution. For example, polyethylene is a mixture of very long chains of -CH_{2}- repeating units, and is generally sold in several molar mass distributions, LDPE, MDPE, HDPE and UHMWPE.

== History ==
The concept of a "chemical substance" became firmly established in the late eighteenth century after work by the chemist Joseph Proust on the composition of some pure chemical compounds such as basic copper carbonate. He deduced that, "All samples of a compound have the same composition; that is, all samples have the same proportions, by mass, of the elements present in the compound." This is now known as the law of constant composition. Later with the advancement of methods for chemical synthesis particularly in the realm of organic chemistry; the discovery of many more chemical elements and new techniques in the realm of analytical chemistry used for isolation and purification of elements and compounds from chemicals that led to the establishment of modern chemistry, the concept was defined as is found in most chemistry textbooks. However, there are some controversies regarding this definition mainly because the large number of chemical substances reported in chemistry literature need to be indexed.

Isomerism caused much consternation to early researchers, since isomers have exactly the same composition, but differ in configuration (arrangement) of the atoms. For example, there was much speculation about the chemical identity of benzene, until the correct structure was described by Friedrich August Kekulé. Likewise, the idea of stereoisomerism – that atoms have rigid three-dimensional structure and can thus form isomers that differ only in their three-dimensional arrangement – was another crucial step in understanding the concept of distinct chemical substances. For example, tartaric acid has three distinct isomers, a pair of diastereomers with one diastereomer forming two enantiomers.

== Chemical elements ==
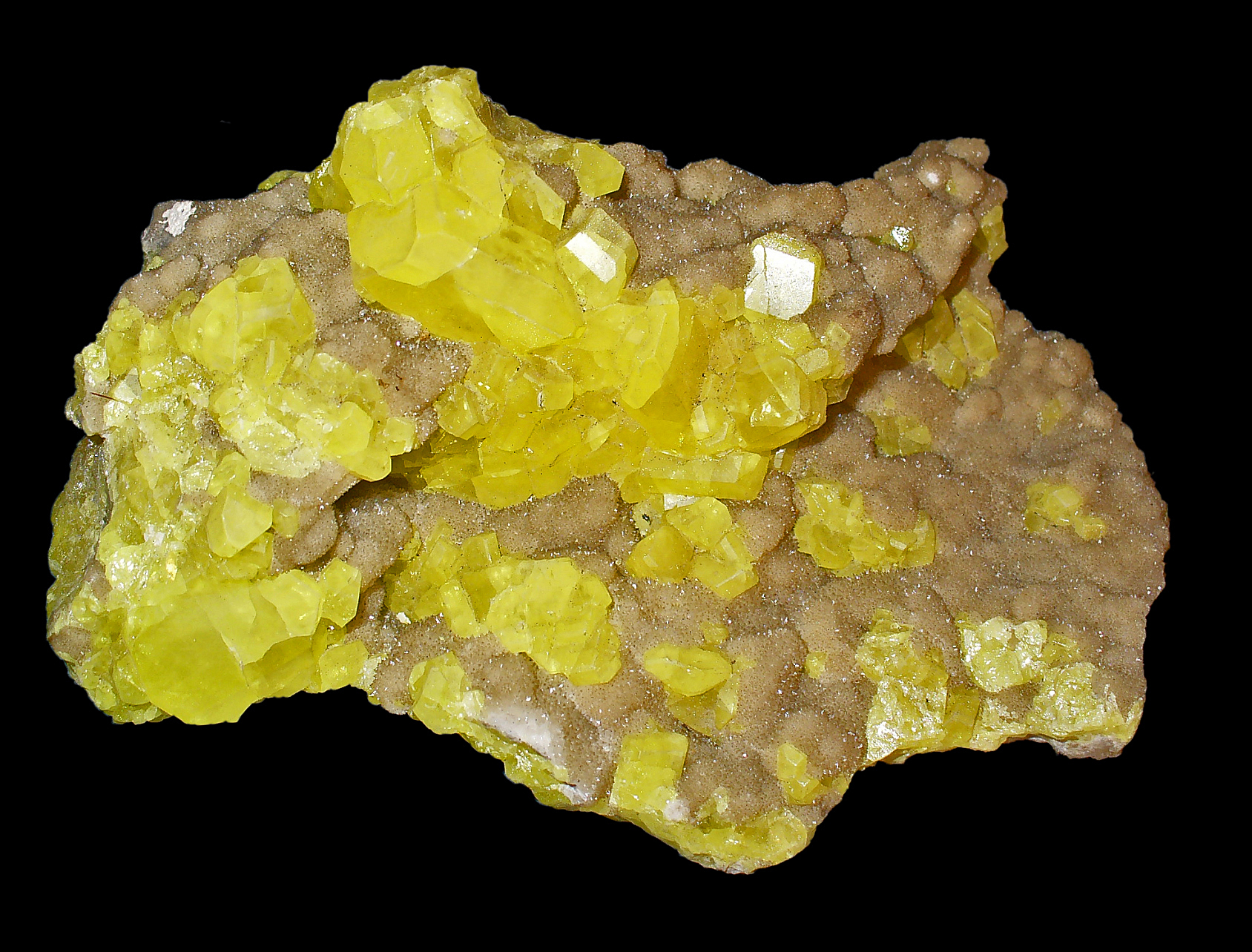
Native sulfur crystals. Sulfur occurs naturally as elemental sulfur, in sulfide and sulfate minerals, in organosulfur compounds, and in hydrogen sulfide.

An element is a chemical substance made up of a particular kind of atom and hence cannot be broken down or transformed by a chemical reaction into a different element, though it can be transmuted into another element through a nuclear reaction. This is because all of the atoms in a sample of an element have the same number of protons, though they may be different isotopes, with differing numbers of neutrons.

As of 2025, there are 118 known elements, about 80 of which are stable – that is, they do not change by radioactive decay into other elements. Some elements can occur as more than a single chemical substance (allotropes). For instance, oxygen exists as both diatomic oxygen (O_{2}) and ozone (O_{3}). The majority of elements are classified as metals. These are elements with a characteristic lustre such as iron, copper, and gold. Metals typically conduct electricity and heat well, and they are malleable and ductile. Around 14 to 21 elements, such as carbon, nitrogen, and oxygen, are classified as non-metals. Non-metals lack the metallic properties described above, they also have a high electronegativity and a tendency to form negative ions. Certain elements such as silicon sometimes resemble metals and sometimes resemble non-metals, and are known as metalloids.

== Chemical compounds ==
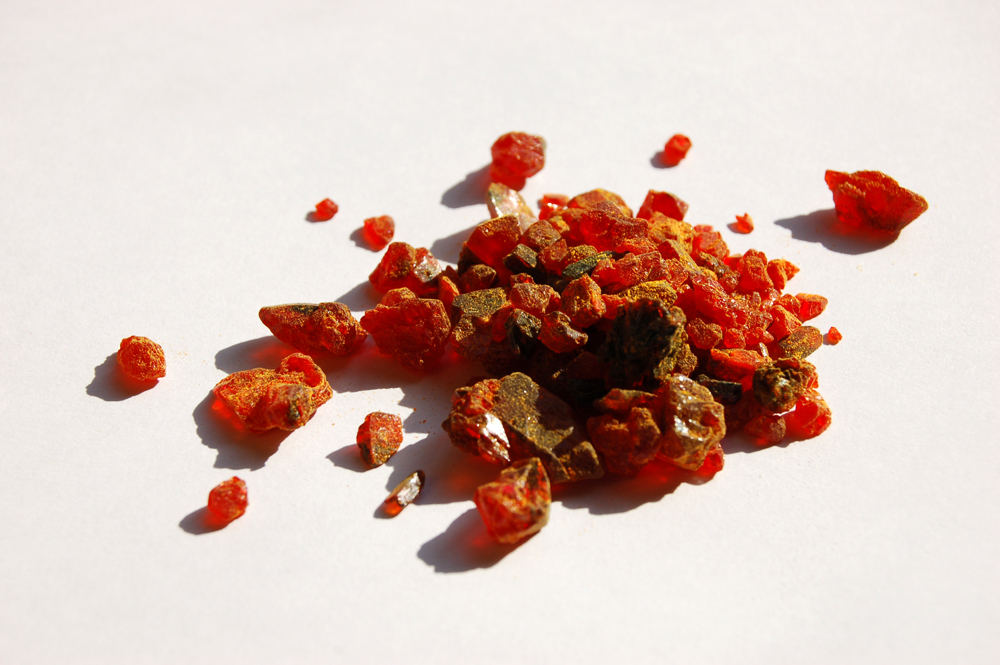
Potassium ferricyanide is a compound of potassium, iron, carbon and nitrogen; although it contains cyanide anions, it does not release them and is nontoxic.

A chemical compound is a chemical substance that is composed of a particular set of atoms or ions. Two or more elements combined into one substance through a chemical reaction form a chemical compound. All compounds are substances, but not all substances are compounds.

A chemical compound can be atoms bonded together in molecules, or in crystals in which atoms, molecules or ions form a crystalline lattice. Compounds based primarily on carbon and hydrogen atoms are called organic compounds, and all others are called inorganic compounds. Compounds containing bonds between carbon and a metal are called organometallic compounds.

Compounds in which components share electrons are known as covalent compounds. Compounds consisting of oppositely charged ions are known as ionic compounds, or salts.

Coordination complexes are compounds where a dative bond keeps the substance together without a covalent or ionic bond. Coordination complexes are distinct substances with distinct properties different from a simple mixture. Typically these have a metal, such as a copper ion, in the center, and a non-metal atom, such as the nitrogen in an ammonia molecule or oxygen in a water molecule, forms a dative bond to the metal center, e.g. tetraamminecopper(II) sulfate [Cu(NH_{3})_{4}]SO_{4}·H_{2}O. The metal is known as a "metal center" and the substance that coordinates to the center is called a "ligand". However, the center does not need to be a metal, as exemplified by boron trifluoride etherate BF_{3}OEt_{2}, where the highly Lewis acidic, but non-metallic boron center takes the role of the "metal". If the ligand bonds to the metal center with multiple atoms, the complex is called a chelate.

In organic chemistry, there can be more than one chemical compound with the same composition and molecular weight. Generally, these are called isomers. Isomers usually have substantially different chemical properties, and often may be isolated without spontaneously interconverting. A common example is glucose vs. fructose. The former is an aldehyde, the latter is a ketone. Their interconversion requires either enzymatic or acid-base catalysis.

However, tautomers are an exception: the isomerization occurs spontaneously in ordinary conditions, such that a pure substance cannot be isolated into its tautomers, even if these can be identified spectroscopically or even isolated in special conditions. A common example is glucose, which has open-chain and ring forms. One cannot manufacture pure open-chain glucose because glucose spontaneously cyclizes to the hemiacetal form.

== Substances versus mixtures ==
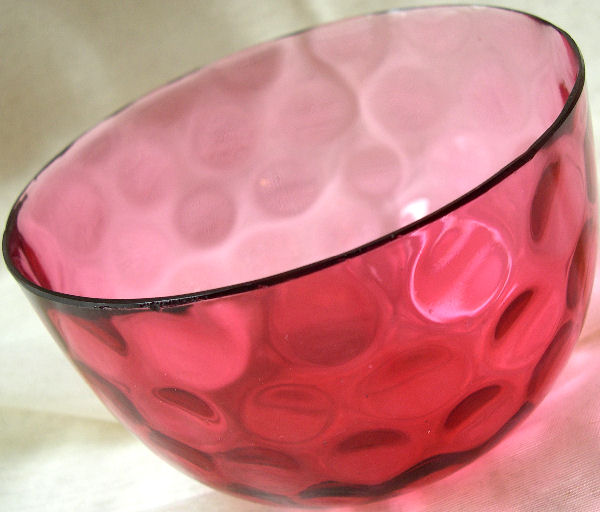
Cranberry glass, while appearing homogeneous, is a mixture consisting of glass and colloidal gold particles of about 40 nm in diameter, giving it a red color.

All matter consists of various elements and chemical compounds, but these are often intimately mixed together. Mixtures contain more than one chemical substance, and they do not have a fixed composition. Butter, soil and wood are common examples of mixtures. Sometimes, mixtures can be separated into their component substances by mechanical processes, such as chromatography, distillation, or evaporation.

Grey iron metal and yellow sulfur are both chemical elements, and they can be mixed together in any ratio to form a yellow-grey mixture. No chemical process occurs, and the material can be identified as a mixture by the fact that the sulfur and the iron can be separated by a mechanical process, such as using a magnet to attract the iron away from the sulfur.

In contrast, if iron and sulfur are heated together in a certain ratio (1 atom of iron for each atom of sulfur, or by weight, 56 grams (1 mol) of iron to 32 grams (1 mol) of sulfur), a chemical reaction takes place and a new substance is formed, the compound iron(II) sulfide, with chemical formula FeS. The resulting compound has all the properties of a chemical substance and is not a mixture. Iron(II) sulfide has its own distinct properties such as melting point and solubility, and the two elements cannot be separated using normal mechanical processes; a magnet will be unable to recover the iron, since there is no metallic iron present in the compound.

== Chemicals versus chemical substances ==
Chemicals in graduated cylinders and beaker

While the term chemical substance is a precise technical term that is synonymous with chemical for chemists, the word chemical is used in general usage to refer to both (pure) chemical substances and mixtures (often called compounds), and especially when produced or purified in a laboratory or an industrial process. In other words, the chemical substances of which fruits and vegetables, for example, are naturally composed even when growing wild are not called "chemicals" in general usage. In countries that require a list of ingredients in products, the "chemicals" listed are industrially produced "chemical substances". The word "chemical" is also often used to refer to addictive, narcotic, or mind-altering drugs.

Within the chemical industry, manufactured "chemicals" are chemical substances, which can be classified by production volume into bulk chemicals, fine chemicals and research chemicals:

- Bulk chemicals are produced in very large quantities, usually with highly optimized continuous processes and to a relatively low price.
- Fine chemicals are produced at a high cost in small quantities for special low-volume applications such as biocides, pharmaceuticals and specialty chemicals for technical applications.
- Research chemicals are produced individually for research, such as when searching for synthetic routes or screening substances for pharmaceutical activity. In effect, their price per gram is very high, although they are not sold.

The cause of the difference in production volume is the complexity of the molecular structure of the chemical. Bulk chemicals are usually much less complex. While fine chemicals may be more complex, many of them are simple enough to be sold as "building blocks" in the synthesis of more complex molecules targeted for single use, as named above. The production of a chemical includes not only its synthesis but also its purification to eliminate by-products, impurities, and unreacted starting material involved in the synthesis. The last step in production should be the analysis of batch lots of chemicals in order to identify and quantify the percentages of impurities for the buyer of the chemicals. The required purity and analysis depends on the application, but higher tolerance of impurities is usually expected in the production of bulk chemicals. Thus, the user of the chemical in the US might choose between the bulk or "technical grade" with higher amounts of impurities or a much purer "pharmaceutical grade" (labeled "USP", United States Pharmacopeia). "Chemicals" in the commercial and legal sense may also include mixtures of highly variable composition, as they are products made to a technical specification instead of particular chemical substances. For example, gasoline is not a single chemical compound or even a particular mixture: different gasolines can have very different chemical compositions, as "gasoline" is primarily defined through source, properties and octane rating.

=== Prejudice on the term "chemical" ===
Chemists note that the distinction of something having "chemicals" is sometimes used in pejorative sense to differentiate something that is "natural" vs "artificial". Such usage is incorrect since all things the universe are chemical by default and their origins play no role on whether it has toxic, hazardous, healthy or nutritious characteristics. Chemists state that the more knowledge on chemicals an individual gains, the less chemophobic they will be.

== Naming and indexing ==
Every chemical substance has one or more systematic names, usually named according to the IUPAC rules for naming. An alternative system is used by the Chemical Abstracts Service (CAS).

Many compounds are also known by their more common, simpler names, many of which predate the systematic name. For example, the long-known sugar glucose is now systematically named 6-(hydroxymethyl)oxane-2,3,4,5-tetrol. Natural products and pharmaceuticals are also given simpler names, for example the mild pain-killer Naproxen is the more common name for the chemical compound (S)-6-methoxy-α-methyl-2-naphthaleneacetic acid.

Chemists frequently refer to chemical compounds using chemical formulae or molecular structure of the compound. There has been a phenomenal growth in the number of chemical compounds being synthesized (or isolated), and then reported in the scientific literature by professional chemists around the world. An enormous number of chemical compounds are possible through the chemical combination of the known chemical elements. As of Feb 2021, about "177 million organic and inorganic substances" (including 68 million defined-sequence biopolymers) are in the scientific literature and registered in public databases. The names of many of these compounds are often nontrivial and hence not very easy to remember or cite accurately. Also, it is difficult to keep track of them in the literature. Several international organizations like IUPAC and CAS have initiated steps to make such tasks easier. CAS provides the abstracting services of the chemical literature, and provides a numerical identifier, known as CAS registry number to each chemical substance that has been reported in the chemical literature (such as chemistry journals and patents). This information is compiled as a database and is popularly known as the Chemical substances index. Other computer-friendly systems that have been developed for substance information are: SMILES and the International Chemical Identifier or InChI.

Identification of a typical chemical substance
Common name	Systematic name	Chemical formula	Chemical structure	CAS registry number	InChI
Alcohol, or ethyl alcohol	Ethanol	C_{2}H_{5}OH		[64-17-5]	1/C2H6O/c1-2-3/h3H,2H2,1H3

== Isolation, purification, characterization, and identification ==
Often a pure substance needs to be isolated from a mixture, for example from a natural source (where a sample often contains numerous chemical substances) or after a chemical reaction (which often gives mixtures of chemical substances).

== Measurement ==
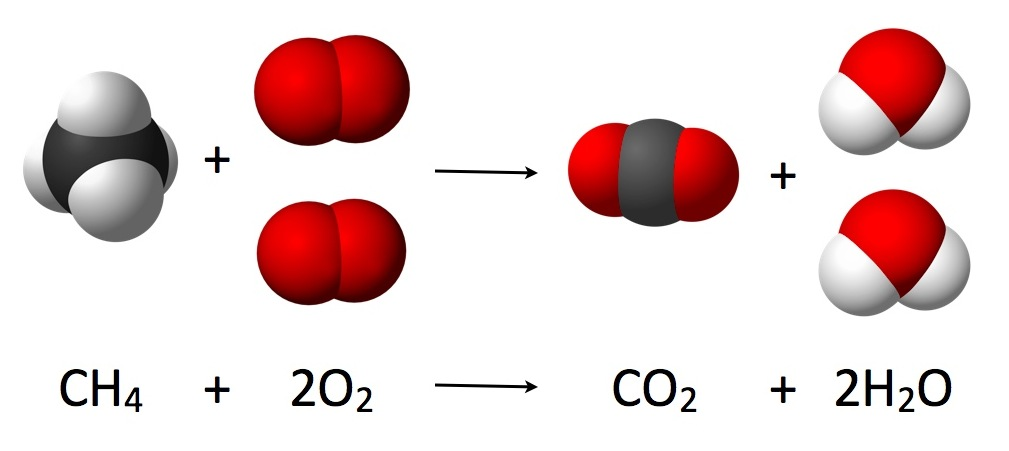
A stoichiometric diagram of the combustion reaction of methane

Stoichiometry (/ˌstɔɪkiˈɒmɪtri/ ) is the relationships between the quantities of reactants and products before, during and after chemical reactions.

Stoichiometry is based on the law of conservation of mass; the total mass of reactants must equal the total mass of products, so the relationship between reactants and products must form a ratio of positive integers. This means that if the amounts of the separate reactants are known, then the amount of the product can be calculated. Conversely, if one reactant has a known quantity and the quantity of the products can be empirically determined, then the amount of the other reactants can also be calculated.

This is illustrated in the image here, where the unbalanced equation is:

CH_{4} (g) + O_{2} (g) → CO_{2} (g) + H_{2}O (l)
However, the current equation is imbalanced. The reactants have 4 hydrogen and 2 oxygen atoms, while the product has 2 hydrogen and 3 oxygen. To balance the hydrogen, a coefficient of 2 is added to the product H_{2}O, and to fix the imbalance of oxygen, it is also added to O_{2}. Thus, we get:
CH_{4} (g) + 2 O_{2} (g) → CO_{2} (g) + 2 H_{2}O (l)

Here, one molecule of methane reacts with two molecules of oxygen gas to yield one molecule of carbon dioxide and two molecules of liquid water. This particular chemical equation is an example of complete combustion. The numbers in front of each quantity are a set of stoichiometric coefficients which directly reflect the molar ratios between the products and reactants. Stoichiometry measures these quantitative relationships, and is used to determine the amount of products and reactants that are produced or needed in a given reaction.

Describing the quantitative relationships among substances as they participate in chemical reactions is known as reaction stoichiometry. In the example above, reaction stoichiometry measures the relationship between the quantities of methane and oxygen that react to form carbon dioxide and water: for every mole of methane combusted, two moles of oxygen are consumed, one mole of carbon dioxide is produced, and two moles of water are produced.

Because of the well-known relationship of moles to atomic weights, the ratios that are arrived at by stoichiometry can be used to determine quantities by weight in a reaction described by a balanced equation. This is called composition stoichiometry.

Gas stoichiometry deals with reactions solely involving gases, where the gases are at a known temperature, pressure, and volume and can be assumed to be ideal gases. For gases, the volume ratio is ideally the same by the ideal gas law, but the mass ratio of a single reaction has to be calculated from the molecular masses of the reactants and products. In practice, because of the existence of isotopes, molar masses are used instead in calculating the mass ratio.

== See also ==
- Hazard symbol
- Homogeneous and heterogeneous mixtures
- Prices of chemical elements
- Dedicated bio-based chemical
- Fire diamond
