= Gold bar =

Quantity of refined metallic gold

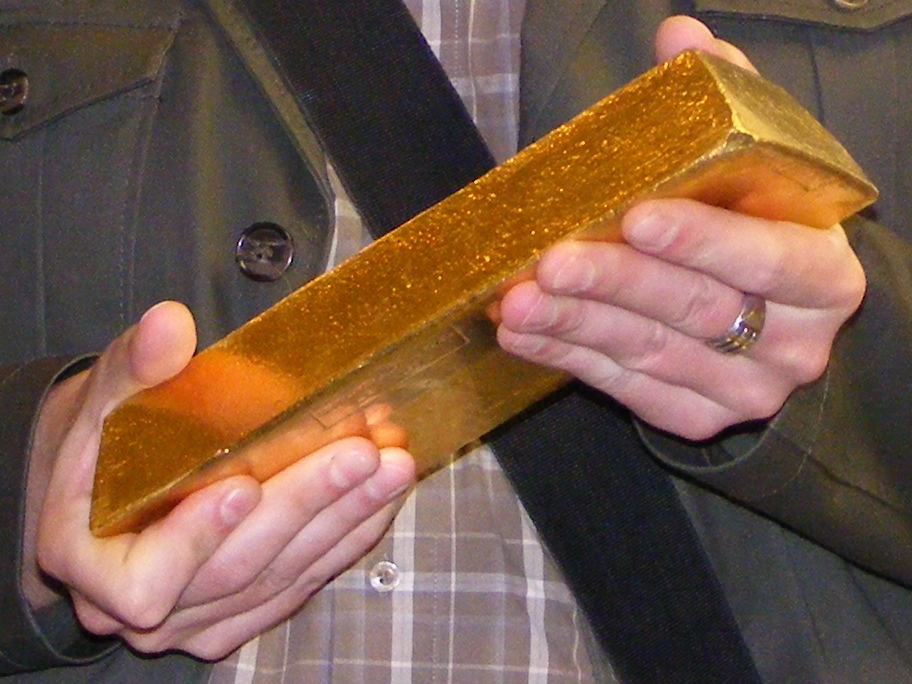
Good Delivery gold bar weighing 12.4 kilograms (400 ozt)

A gold bar is a common form for bulk storage and transport of gold bullion. Larger varieties of gold bars, produced by casting molten metal into molds, are called ingots. Smaller bars are often created through minting or stamping from rolled gold sheets. Central banks typically hold in their gold reserves the standard 400-troy-ounce (438.9-ounce; 27.4-pound; 12.4-kilogram) Good Delivery gold bar, which is widely traded among bullion dealers. Additionally, the kilobar, weighing 1,000 grams (32.15 troy ounces), and the 100-troy-ounce (109.7-ounce; 6.9-pound; 3.1-kilogram) gold bar are popular for trading and investment because of their more manageable size and weight. These bars carry a minimal premium over the spot price of gold, facilitating small transfers between banks and traders. While most kilobars have a flat appearance, a preference for brick-shaped bars exists among some investors, particularly in Europe.

== Types ==
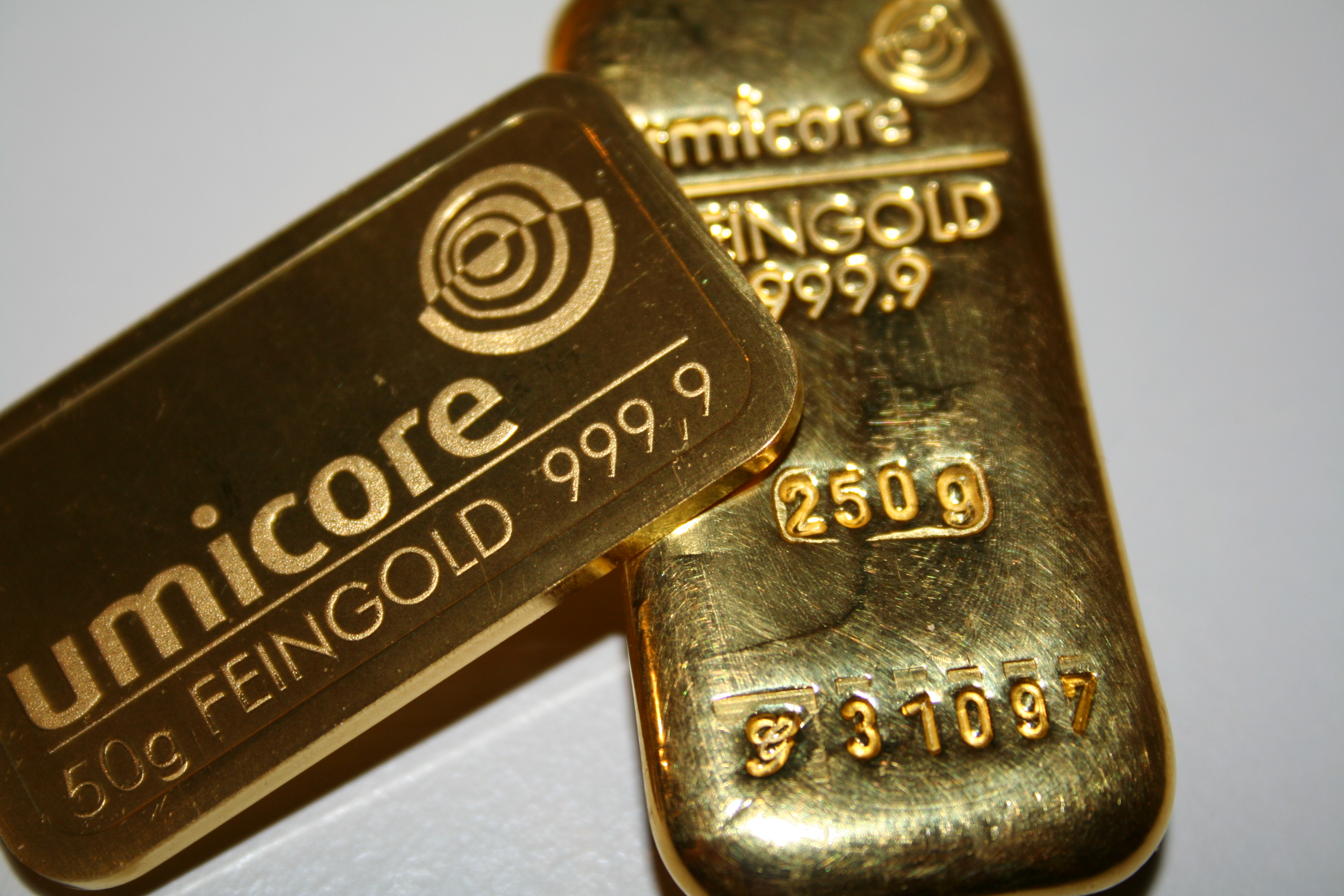
A minted bar (left) and a cast bar (right)

Gold bars are classified based on their production process into cast or minted forms, each differing in their appearance and market value. Cast bars, similar to ingots, are formed by pouring molten gold into a mold shaped like a bar, then allowing it to cool and solidify. This method often results in bars with irregular shapes and uneven surfaces, granting each bar a unique identity and making them easily recognizable. Due to their relatively simple production process and minimal handling, cast bars are generally less expensive than their minted counterparts.

Minted bars are made from gold blanks, which are precisely cut from a flat gold sheet to achieve the desired dimensions. These bars are characterized by their smooth and uniform surfaces, reflecting a more refined and labor-intensive manufacturing process.

== Security features ==
Manufacturers have developed measures to ensure the authenticity of gold bars and to protect them against counterfeiting or theft. The most prevalent method involves marking bars with unique registered serial numbers or issuing a certificate of authenticity. Some refineries emboss even the smallest bars with serial numbers, which should correspond with the numbers on their associated certificates.

In contrast to cast bars, which may be handled directly, minted bars are typically enclosed in protective packaging or equipped with tamper-evident technology to deter tampering and prevent damage. Additionally, a security feature known as a Kinegram, a type of hologram, can be embossed directly onto a gold bar. Bars containing this feature are referred to as Kinebars.

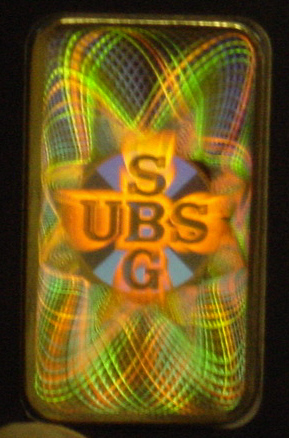
1 oz diffractive kinebar

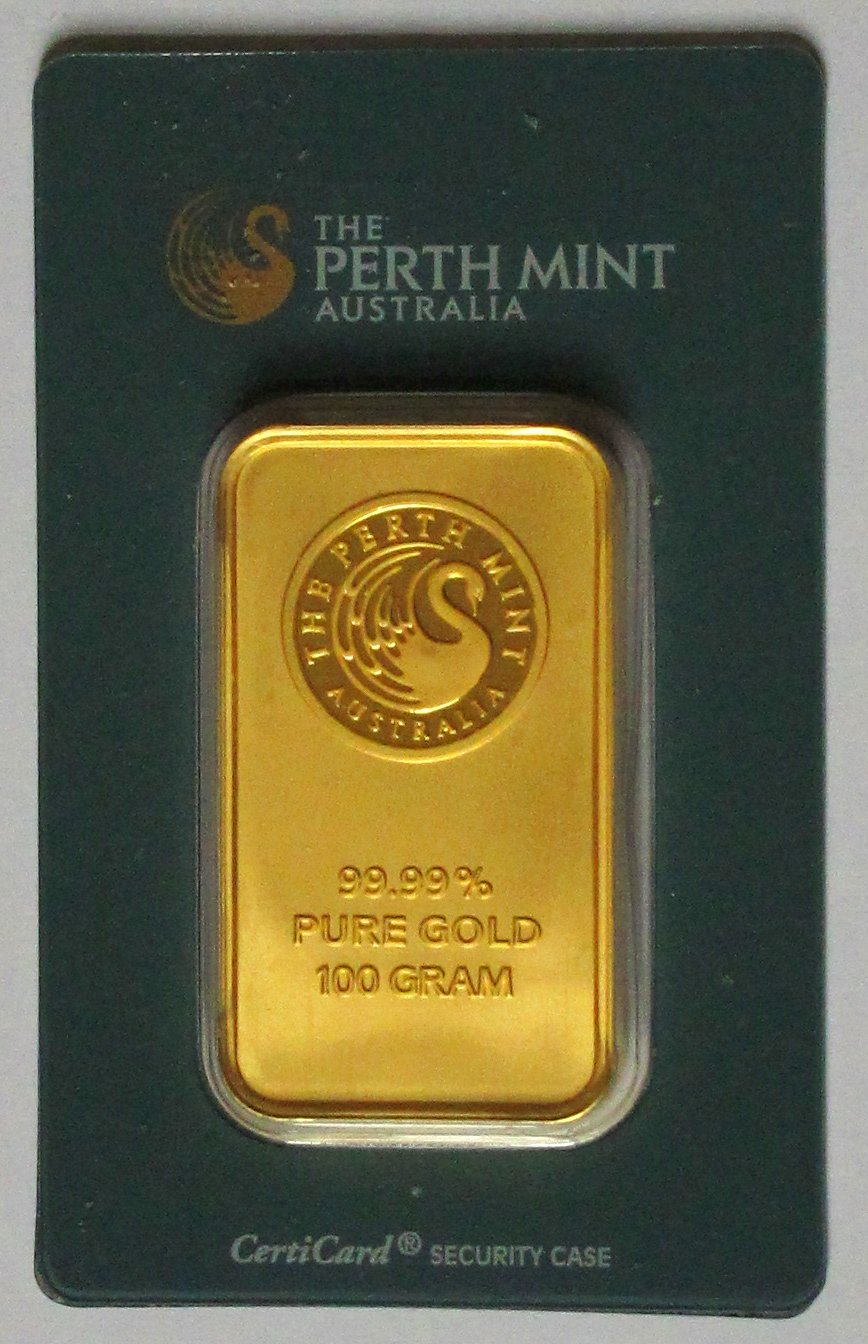
Bar in protective casing

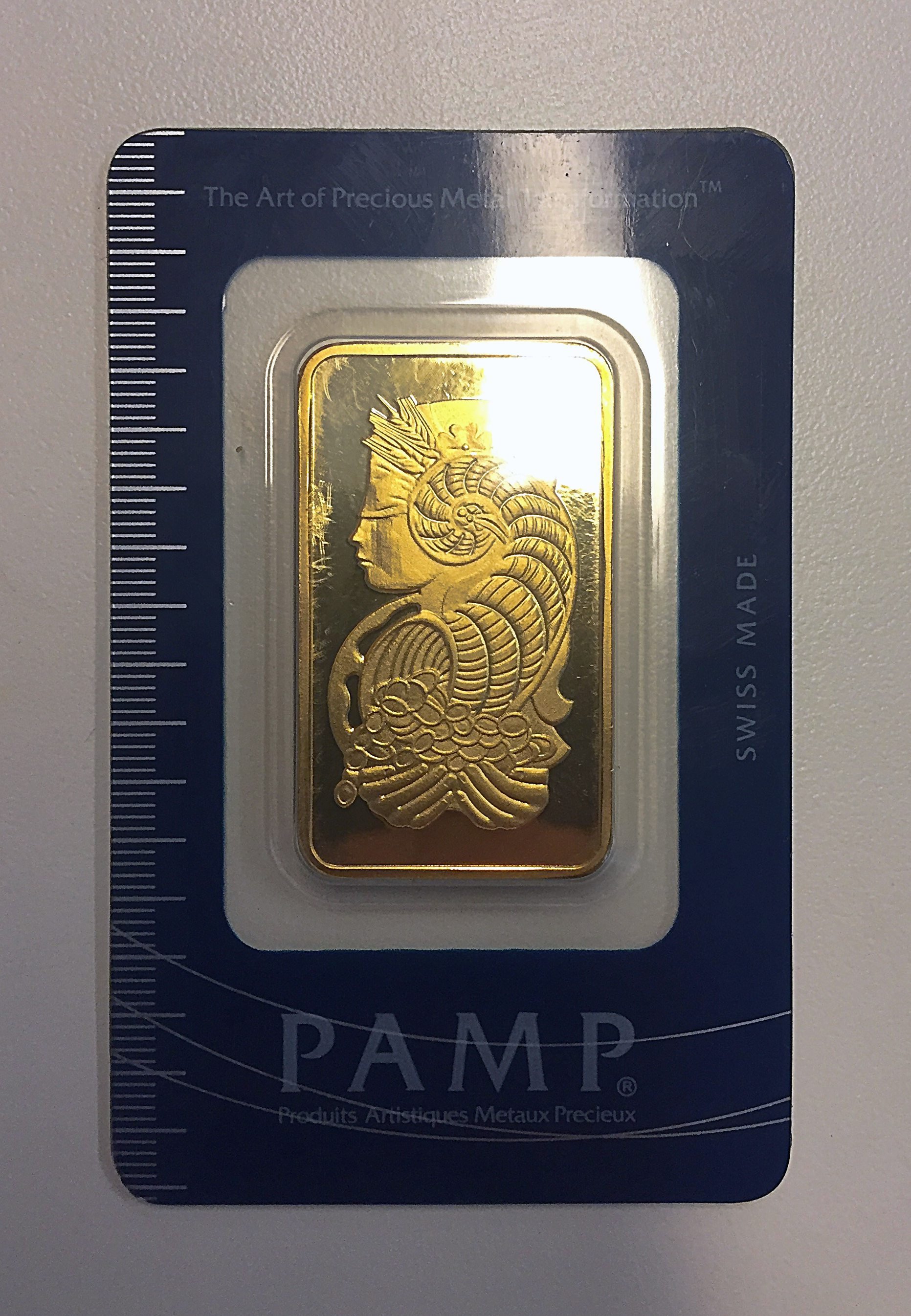
Fake Chinese gold bar, with counterfeit blister pack

== Standard bar weight units ==
Gold prices (US$ per troy ounce), in nominal US$ and inflation adjusted US$ from 1914 onward

Gold is measured in troy ounces, often simply referred to as ounces when the reference to gold is evident. One troy ounce is equivalent to 31.1034768 grams. The troy ounce is heavier than the avoirdupois ounce, a commonly used unit for measuring weight in the United States customary system.

The standard gold bar held and traded internationally by central banks and bullion dealers is the Good Delivery bar with a 400 ozt (12.4 kg; 27.4 lb) nominal weight. However, its precise gold content is permitted to vary between 350 ozt (10.9 kg; 24.0 lb) and 430 ozt (13.4 kg; 29.5 lb). The minimum purity required is 995 ‰ gold. These bars must be stored in recognized and secure gold bullion vaults to maintain their quality status of Good Delivery. The recorded provenance of this bar assures integrity and maximum resale value.

- One tonne = 1,000 kilograms = 32,150.746 troy ounces.
- One kilogram = 1,000 grams = 32.15074656 troy ounces.
- One tola = 11.6638038 grams = 0.375 troy ounces.
- One tael = 50 grams. (Note: This is the official rate of taels in mainland China since the country implemented the metric system. In Taiwan and Hong Kong, a tael is equivalent to 37.429 g.)

== Manufacturers ==
Manufacturer	Bar sizes																									
Manufacturer	Grams											Ounces									Taels	Tolas				
Manufacturer	1	2	2.5	5	10	20	50	100	250	500	1,000	1/10	1/4	1/2	1	2.5	5	10	100	400	1	1	2	3	5	10
Baird & Co.	✓		✓	✓	✓	✓	✓	✓	✓	✓	✓	✓	✓	✓	✓		✓	✓								
Emirates Gold	✓		✓	✓	✓	✓	✓	✓			✓			✓	✓							✓				
Heraeus	✓	✓		✓	✓	✓	✓	✓	✓	✓	✓				✓											
Metalor	✓	✓		✓	✓	✓	✓	✓	✓	✓	✓				✓					✓						
PAMP	✓		✓	✓	✓	✓	✓	✓	✓	✓	✓			✓	✓		✓	✓		✓	✓	✓	✓	✓	✓	✓
Perth Mint	✓			✓	✓	✓	✓	✓			✓			✓	✓	✓	✓	✓		✓						
Royal Canadian Mint											✓				✓		✓	✓	✓	✓						
Royal Mint	✓			✓	✓			✓		✓	✓				✓					✓						
Umicore	✓		✓	✓	✓	✓	✓	✓	✓	✓	✓				✓					✓						
Valcambi	✓		✓	✓	✓	✓	✓	✓	✓	✓	✓				✓					✓					✓	✓
UBS	✓	✓		✓	✓	✓	✓	✓	✓	✓	✓				✓											

== Largest gold bar ==
The largest bar of gold weighed 300.12 kg (661 lb 10 oz) and was made by Emirates Minting Factory LLC (UAE), in Dubai, United Arab Emirates, on 10 November 2024. As of May 2026, the valuation of this bar is approximately US$45 million. As in many good delivery bars, the bar is in the shape of a trapezoidal prism.

== See also ==
- Bullion
- Doré bar
- Gold as an investment
- Gold coin
