= Prices of chemical elements =

This is a list of prices of chemical elements. Listed here are mainly average market prices for bulk trade of commodities. Data on elements' abundance in Earth's crust is added for comparison.

As of 2025, the most expensive non-synthetic element by mass is rhodium, and by volume, iridium. It is followed by rhodium, caesium, iridium and palladium by mass and iridium, gold and platinum by volume. Carbon in the form of diamond can be more expensive than rhodium. Per-kilogram prices of some synthetic radioisotopes range to trillions of dollars. While the difficulty of obtaining macroscopic samples of synthetic elements in part explains their high value, there has been interest in converting base metals to gold (chrysopoeia) since ancient times, but only deeper understanding of nuclear physics has allowed the actual production of a tiny amount of gold from other elements for research purposes as demonstrated by Glenn Seaborg. However, both this and other routes of synthesis of precious metals via nuclear reactions is orders of magnitude removed from economic viability.

Chlorine, sulfur and carbon (as coal) are cheapest by mass. Hydrogen, nitrogen, oxygen and chlorine are cheapest by volume at atmospheric pressure.

When there is no public data on the element in its pure form, the price of a compound is used, per mass of element contained. This implicitly puts the value of the compounds' other constituents, and the cost of extraction of the element, at zero. For elements whose radiological properties are important, individual isotopes and isomers are listed. The price listing for radioisotopes is not exhaustive.

== Chart ==
A pink background means that the element is significantly radioactive.

Bismuth is not highlighted because its radioactivity is considered negligible here. (Bismuth is stable enough to be used for the production of cosmetics.)

Z	Symbol	Name	Density (Note: Density for 0 °C, 101.325 kPa. For individual isotopes except deuterium, density of base element is used. Values in parentheses are theoretical predictions.) (kg/L)	Abundance and total mass in Earth's crust (Note: Unless otherwise indicated, elements are primordial – they occur naturally, and not through decay.) (mg/kg)	Price (Note: Values used for currency conversion: Euro: 1999 – 1.0654 USD/EUR; Renminbi: September 2013 – 0.16340 USD/CNY, December 2017 – 0.15159 USD/CNY, November 2019 – 0.14241 USD/CNY, 3 February 2019 – 0.14273 USD/CNY)		Year	Source	Notes
Z	Symbol	Name	Density (kg/L)	Abundance and total mass in Earth's crust (mg/kg)	USD/kg	USD/L (Note: Price per volume for 0 °C, 101.325 kPa, pure element. For individual isotopes except deuterium, density of base element is used.)	Year	Source	Notes
1	H	Hydrogen	0.00008988	1400 (3.878×10^{19} kg)	1.39	0.000125	2012	DOE Hydrogen	(Note: Prices of hydrogen produced by distributed steam methane reforming, as predicted by H2A Production Model from United States Department of Energy, assuming price of natural gas of US$3/MMBtu (US$10/MWh; US$0.10/m^{3}). Does not include cost of storage and distribution.)
1	^{2}H (D)	Deuterium	0.0001667		13400	2.23	2020	CIL	(Note: 99.8% pure compressed deuterium gas, in lot size of 850 L (142 g). Also sold by same supplier in the form of heavy water at price of 3940 USD per kg deuterium. In 2016, Iran sold 32 tons of heavy water to United States for 1336 USD per kg deuterium.)
2	He	Helium	0.0001785	0.008 (2.216×10^{14} kg)	24.0	0.00429	2018	USGS MCS	(Note: Crude helium sold to non-government users in United States in 2018. In the same year, stockpiles of US government helium were sold on auctions for average price of US$0.00989/L.)
3	Li	Lithium	0.534	20 (5.54×10^{17} kg)	81.4–85.6	43.4–45.7	2020	SMM (Note: Spot market price range on 3 February 2020.)	(Note: Min. 99% pure.)
4	Be	Beryllium	1.85	2.8 (7.756×10^{16} kg)	857	1590	2020	ISE 2020 (Note: Market price on 5 February 2020)	(Note: Min. 99% pure.)
5	B	Boron	2.34	10 (2.77×10^{17} kg)	3.68	8.62	2019	CEIC Data (Note: Average price in November 2019. Data from China Petroleum and Chemical Industry Federation.)	(Note: In the form of boric acid, price per boron contained. Min. 99% pure.)
6	C	Carbon	2.267	200 (5.54×10^{18} kg)	0.122	0.28	2018	EIA Coal	(Note: In the form of anthracite, price per carbon contained, assuming 90% carbon content. There is a wide variation of price of carbon depending on its form. Lower ranks of coal can be less expensive, for example sub-bituminous coal can cost around US$0.038/kg carbon. Graphite flakes can cost around US$0.9/kg carbon. Price of synthetic industrial diamond for grinding and polishing can range from 1200 to 13300 USD/kg, while cost per weight of large synthetic diamonds for industrial applications can be on the order of million dollars per kilogram.)
7	N	Nitrogen	0.0012506	19 (5.263×10^{17} kg)	0.140	0.000175	2001	Hypertextbook (Note: In Cryocoolers 11, cited in Hypertextbook)	(Note: As liquid nitrogen.)
8	O	Oxygen	0.001429	461000 (1.277×10^{22} kg)	0.154	0.000220	2001	Hypertextbook	(Note: As liquid oxygen.)
9	F	Fluorine	0.001696	585 (1.62×10^{19} kg)	1.84–2.16	0.00311 – 0.00365	2017	Echemi	(Note: In the form of anhydrous hydrofluoric acid, price per fluorine contained. Range of prices on Chinese market, week of 1–7 December 2017.)
10	Ne	Neon	0.0008999	0.005 (1.385×10^{14} kg)	240	0.21	1999	Ullmann	(Note: Approximate European price for buying small quantities.)
11	Na	Sodium	0.971	23600 (6.537×10^{20} kg)	2.57–3.43	2.49–3.33	2020	SMM	(Note: Min 99.7% pure industrial grade sodium.)
12	Mg	Magnesium	1.738	23300 (6.454×10^{20} kg)	2.32	4.03	2019	Preismonitor (Note: Price average for entire year 2019.)	(Note: Min 99.9% pure.)
13	Al	Aluminium	2.698	82300 (2.28×10^{21} kg)	1.79	4.84	2019	Preismonitor	(Note: High-grade primary aluminium, at London Metal Exchange warehouse.)
14	Si	Silicon	2.3296	282000 (7.811×10^{21} kg)	1.70	3.97	2019	Preismonitor	(Note: Min. 99.1% pure, max. 0.4% iron, 0.4% aluminium, 0.1% calcium. 10–100 mm.)
15	P	Phosphorus	1.82	1050 (2.909×10^{19} kg)	2.69	4.90	2019	CEIC Data	(Note: Min. 99.9% pure yellow phosphorus.)
16	S	Sulfur	2.067	350 (9.695×10^{18} kg)	0.0926	0.191	2019	CEIC Data	
17	Cl	Chlorine	0.003214	145 (4.075×10^{18} kg)	0.082	0.00026	2013	CnAgri	(Note: As chlorine is manufactured together with sodium hydroxide in chloralkali process, relative demand for one product changes the price for the other. When demand for sodium hydroxide is relatively high, chlorine price can fall to arbitrarily low levels, even to zero.)
18	Ar	Argon	0.0017837	3.5 (9.695×10^{16} kg)	0.931	0.00166	2019	UNLV	(Note: Liquid argon supply contract for University of Nevada, Las Vegas.)
19	K	Potassium	0.862	20900 (5.789×10^{20} kg)	12.1–13.6	10.5–11.7	2020	SMM	(Note: Min 98.5% pure industrial grade potassium.)
20	Ca	Calcium	1.54	41500 (1.15×10^{21} kg)	2.21–2.35	3.41–3.63	2020	SMM	(Note: Blocks of 98.5% pure calcium obtained by reduction process.)
21	Sc	Scandium	2.989	22 (6.094×10^{17} kg)	3460	10300	2020	ISE 2020 (Note: Market price on 4 February 2020)	(Note: Min. 99.99% pure.)
22	Ti	Titanium	4.54	5650 (1.565×10^{20} kg)	11.1–11.7	50.5–53.1	2020	SMM	(Note: Min. 99.6% pure titanium sponge.)
23	V	Vanadium	6.11	120 (3.324×10^{18} kg)	357–385	2180–2350	2020	SMM	(Note: Min. 99.5% pure.)
24	Cr	Chromium	7.15	102 (2.825×10^{18} kg)	9.40	67.2	2019	Preismonitor	(Note: Min. 99.2% pure.)
25	Mn	Manganese	7.44	950 (2.632×10^{19} kg)	1.82	13.6	2019	Preismonitor	(Note: Electrolytic manganese, min. 99.7% pure.)
26	Fe	Iron	7.874	56300 (1.565×10^{21} kg)	0.424	3.34	2020	SMM	(Note: L8-10 pig iron. At Tangshan, China.)
27	Co	Cobalt	8.86	25 (6.925×10^{17} kg)	32.8	291	2019	Preismonitor	(Note: Spot price. Min. 99.8% pure. At London Metal Exchange warehouse.)
28	Ni	Nickel	8.912	84 (2.327×10^{18} kg)	13.9	124	2019	Preismonitor	(Note: Primary nickel. Spot price. Min. 99.8% pure. At London Metal Exchange warehouse.)
29	Cu	Copper	8.96	60 (1.662×10^{18} kg)	6.00	53.8	2019	Preismonitor	(Note: Spot price. Grade A. At London Metal Exchange warehouse.)
30	Zn	Zinc	7.134	70 (1.939×10^{18} kg)	2.55	18.2	2019	Preismonitor	(Note: Min. 99.995% pure special high grade zinc metal. Spot price. At London Metal Exchange warehouse.)
31	Ga	Gallium	5.907	19 (5.263×10^{17} kg)	1530	9040	2026	Stockatomics	(Note: Monthly U.S. price per kg of gallium contained, August 2026.)
32	Ge	Germanium	5.323	1.5 (4.155×10^{16} kg)	4860	25900	2026	Stockatomics	(Note: Monthly U.S. price per kg of germanium contained, August 2026.)
33	As	Arsenic	5.776	1.8 (4.986×10^{16} kg)	0.999–1.31	5.77–7.58	2020	SMM	(Note: Min. 99.5% pure.)
34	Se	Selenium	4.809	0.05 (1.385×10^{15} kg)	21.4	103	2019	Preismonitor	(Note: Selenium powder, min. 99.9% pure.)
35	Br	Bromine	3.122	2.4 (6.648×10^{16} kg)	4.39	13.7	2019	CEIC Data	
36	Kr	Krypton	0.003733	1×10^{−4} (2.77×10^{12} kg)	290	1.1	1999	Ullmann	(Note: Approximate European price for buying small quantities.)
37	Rb	Rubidium	1.532	90 (2.493×10^{18} kg)	15500	23700	2018	USGS MCS	(Note: 100 g ampoules of 99.75% pure rubidium metal.)
38	Sr	Strontium	2.64	370 (1.025×10^{19} kg)	6.53–6.68	17.2–17.6	2019	ISE 2019	(Note: Min. 99% pure, Ex Works China.)
39	Y	Yttrium	4.469	33 (9.141×10^{17} kg)	31.0	139	2019	Preismonitor	(Note: Min. 99% pure, Free on Board China.)
40	Zr	Zirconium	6.506	165 (4.571×10^{18} kg)	35.7–37.1	232–241	2020	SMM	(Note: Zirconium sponge, min. 99% pure.)
41	Nb	Niobium	8.57	20 (5.54×10^{17} kg)	61.4–85.6	526–734	2020	SMM	(Note: Min. 99.9% pure.)
42	Mo	Molybdenum	10.22	1.2 (3.324×10^{16} kg)	40.1	410	2019	Preismonitor	(Note: Min. 99.95% pure.)
43	Tc	Technetium	11.5	~ 3×10^{−9} (Note: This element is transient – it occurs only through decay (and in the case of plutonium, also in traces deposited from supernovae onto Earth).) (8.31×10^{7} kg)	100000	1200000	2004 (Note: or earlier)	CRC Handbook (Note: The values reported are present in 85th edition of CRC Handbook of Chemistry and Physics (and possibly earlier) and remain unchanged to at least 97th edition.)	
43	^{99m}Tc	Technetium-99m	11.5		1.9×10^{12}	22×10^{12}	2008	NRC	(Note: In the form of medical doses of sodium pertechnetate made on-site in technetium-99m generators. Price per technetium contained. Range of prices for medical doses available in the United States. Technetium-99m has half-life of 6 hours, which limits its ability to be directly traded.)
44	Ru	Ruthenium	12.37	0.001 (2.77×10^{13} kg)	10400 – 10600	129000 – 131000	2020	SMM	(Note: 99.95% pure.)
45	Rh	Rhodium	12.41	0.001 (2.77×10^{13} kg)	147000	1820000	2019	Preismonitor	(Note: 99.95% pure.)
46	Pd	Palladium	12.02	0.015 (4.155×10^{14} kg)	49500	595000	2019	Preismonitor	(Note: 99.95% pure. London bullion market afternoon fix. In warehouse.)
47	Ag	Silver	10.501	0.075 (2.0775×10^{15} kg)	521	5470	2019	Preismonitor	(Note: 99.5% pure. Spot price. At London Metal Exchange warehouse.)
48	Cd	Cadmium	8.69	0.159 (4.4043×10^{15} kg)	2.73	23.8	2019	Preismonitor	(Note: Ingot, min. 99.99% pure.)
49	In	Indium	7.31	0.25 (6.925×10^{15} kg)	167	1220	2019	Preismonitor	(Note: Min. 99.99% pure.)
50	Sn	Tin	7.287	2.3 (6.371×10^{16} kg)	18.7	136	2019	Preismonitor	(Note: Min. 99.85% pure. Spot price. At London Metal Exchange warehouse.)
51	Sb	Antimony	6.685	0.2 (5.54×10^{15} kg)	22.9	153	2026	Stockatomics	(Note: Monthly U.S. price per kg of antimony contained, August 2026.)
52	Te	Tellurium	6.232	0.001 (2.77×10^{13} kg)	63.5	396	2019	Preismonitor	(Note: Min. 99.99% pure. Europe.)
53	I	Iodine	4.93	0.45 (1.2465×10^{16} kg)	35	173	2019	Industrial Minerals	(Note: Min 99.5% pure. Spot market price on 2 August 2019.)
54	Xe	Xenon	0.005887	3×10^{−5} (8.31×10^{11} kg)	1800	11	1999	Ullmann	(Note: Approximate European price for buying small quantities.)
55	Cs	Caesium	1.873	3 (8.31×10^{16} kg)	61800	116000	2018	USGS MCS	(Note: 1 g ampoules of 99.8% pure caesium.)
56	Ba	Barium	3.594	425 (1.177×10^{19} kg)	0.246–0.275	0.886–0.990	2016	USGS MYB 2016	(Note: In the form of chemical-grade barite (barium sulfate) exported from China to United States. Price per barium contained, includes cost, insurance, and freight. Barium sulfate is the primary feedstock for production of barium chemicals.)
57	La	Lanthanum	6.145	39 (1.08×10^{18} kg)	4.78–4.92	29.4–30.3	2020	SMM	(Note: Min. 99% pure.)
58	Ce	Cerium	6.77	66.5 (1.84205×10^{18} kg)	4.57–4.71	30.9–31.9	2020	SMM	(Note: Min. 99% pure.)
59	Pr	Praseodymium	6.773	9.2 (2.5484×10^{17} kg)	103	695	2019	Preismonitor	(Note: Min. 99% pure, Free on Board China.)
60	Nd	Neodymium	7.007	41.5 (1.14955×10^{18} kg)	57.5	403	2019	Preismonitor	(Note: Min. 99% pure, Free on Board China.)
61	^{147}Pm	Promethium-147	7.26		460000	3400000	2003	Radiochemistry Society	(Note: From Periodic Table of the Elements published on website of Radiochemistry Society. There is no further information as to source or specifics of this price.)
62	Sm	Samarium	7.52	7.05 (1.95285×10^{17} kg)	13.9	104	2019	Preismonitor	(Note: Min. 99% pure, Free on Board China.)
63	Eu	Europium	5.243	2 (5.54×10^{16} kg)	31.4	165	2020	ISE 2020	(Note: Min. 99.999% pure.)
64	Gd	Gadolinium	7.895	6.2 (1.7174×10^{17} kg)	28.6	226	2020	ISE 2020	(Note: Min. 99.5% pure.)
65	Tb	Terbium	8.229	1.2 (3.324×10^{16} kg)	658	5410	2019	Preismonitor	(Note: Min. 99% pure, Free on Board China.)
66	Dy	Dysprosium	8.55	5.2 (1.4404×10^{17} kg)	307	2630	2019	Preismonitor	(Note: Min. 99% pure, Free on Board China.)
67	Ho	Holmium	8.795	1.3 (3.601×10^{16} kg)	57.1	503	2020	ISE 2020	(Note: Min. 99.5% pure.)
68	Er	Erbium	9.066	3.5 (9.695×10^{16} kg)	26.4	240	2020	ISE 2020	(Note: Min. 99.5% pure.)
69	Tm	Thulium	9.321	0.52 (1.4404×10^{16} kg)	3000	28000	2003	IMAR (Note: Source lists prices of other rare earth elements (some of which are significantly different than the ones presented in table above): lanthanum – 25 USD/kg; cerium – 30 USD/kg; praseodymium – 70 USD/kg; neodymium – 30 USD/kg; samarium – 80 USD/kg; europium – 1600 USD/kg; gadolinium – 78 USD/kg; terbium – 630 USD/kg; dysprosium – 120 USD/kg; holmium – 350 USD/kg; erbium – 180 USD/kg; thulium – 3000 USD/kg; ytterbium – 484 USD/kg; lutetium – 4000 USD/kg; yttrium – 96 USD/kg)	(Note: Price quotes from Canadian producer, for 1 kg order. 99.5–99.99% purity, Free on Board Vancouver, Canada.)
70	Yb	Ytterbium	6.965	3.2 (8.864×10^{16} kg)	17.1	119	2020	ISE 2020	(Note: Min. 99.99% pure.)
71	Lu	Lutetium	9.84	0.8 (2.216×10^{16} kg)	643	6330	2020	ISE 2020	(Note: Min. 99.99% pure.)
72	Hf	Hafnium	13.31	3 (8.31×10^{16} kg)	900	12000	2017	USGS MCS	(Note: Unwrought hafnium.)
73	Ta	Tantalum	16.654	2 (5.54×10^{16} kg)	298–312	4960–5200	2019	ISE 2019	(Note: Min. 99.95% pure. Ex Works China.)
74	W	Tungsten	19.25	1.3 (3.601×10^{16} kg)	127	2450	2026	Stockatomics	(Note: Monthly U.S. price per kg of tungsten contained, August 2026.)
75	Re	Rhenium	21.02	7×10^{−4} (1.939×10^{13} kg)	3010–4150	63300 – 87300	2020	SMM	(Note: 99.99% pure.)
76	Os	Osmium	22.61	0.002 (5.54×10^{13} kg)	30000	678000	2025	elementsales.com	
77	Ir	Iridium	22.56	0.001 (2.77×10^{13} kg)	144000	3276000	2025	Umicore	
78	Pt	Platinum	21.46	0.005 (1.385×10^{14} kg)	27800	596000	2019	Preismonitor	(Note: 99.95% pure. London bullion market morning fix. In warehouse.)
79	Au	Gold	19.282	0.004 (1.108×10^{14} kg)	75430	1454441	2024	London gold fix	(Note: 99.9% pure. Afternoon London gold fix.)
80	Hg	Mercury	13.5336	0.085 (2.3545×10^{15} kg)	30.2	409	2017	USGS MCS	(Note: Average European Union price of 99.99% pure mercury.)
81	Tl	Thallium	11.85	0.85 (2.3545×10^{16} kg)	4200	49800	2017	USGS MCS	
82	Pb	Lead	11.342	14 (3.878×10^{17} kg)	2.00	22.6	2019	Preismonitor	(Note: Min. 99.97% pure. Spot price. At London Metal Exchange warehouse.)
83	Bi	Bismuth	9.807	0.009 (2.493×10^{14} kg)	6.36	62.4	2019	Preismonitor	(Note: Refined bismuth, min. 99.99% pure.)
84	^{209}Po	Polonium-209	9.32		49.2×10^{12}	458×10^{12}	2004	CRC Handbook (ORNL) (Note: Available from Oak Ridge National Laboratory as reported in CRC Handbook of Chemistry and Physics. Price does not include packing costs. The values reported are present in Handbook's 85th edition (and possibly earlier) and remain unchanged to at least 97th edition.)	
85	At	Astatine	7	3×10^{−20} (8.31×10^{−4} kg)	Not traded.				(Note: Only under a tenth of microgram of astatine has ever been produced. Most stable isotope has half-life of 8.1 hours.)
86	Rn	Radon	0.00973	4×10^{−13} (1.108×10^{4} kg)	Not traded.				(Note: Used in brachytherapy until 1960s, currently radon is not used commercially.)
87	Fr	Francium	1.87	~ 1×10^{−18} (2.77×10^{−2} kg)	Not traded.				(Note: Only quantities of the order of millions of atoms have been obtained for research. Most stable isotope, ^{223}Fr, has half-life of 22 minutes. Francium has no commercial or medical uses.)
88	Ra	Radium	5.5	9×10^{−7} (2.493×10^{10} kg)	Negative price.				(Note: Radium was historically used in the treatment of cancer, but stopped being used when more effective treatments were introduced. As medical facilities had to pay for its disposal, its price can be considered negative.)
89	^{225}Ac	Actinium-225	10.07		29×10^{12}	290×10^{12}	2004	CRC Handbook (ORNL)	
90	Th	Thorium	11.72	9.6 (2.6592×10^{17} kg)	287	3360	2010	USGS MYB 2012	(Note: As 99.9% pure thorium oxide, price per thorium contained. Free on Board port of entry, duty paid.)
91	Pa	Protactinium	15.37	1.4×10^{−6} (3.878×10^{10} kg)	No reliable price available.				(Note: In 1959–1961 Great Britain Atomic Energy Authority produced 125 g of 99.9% pure protactinium at a cost of $500000, giving the cost of 4000000 USD per kg. Periodic Table of Elements at Los Alamos National Laboratory website at one point listed protactinium-231 as available from Oak Ridge National Laboratory at a price of 280000 USD/kg.)
92	U	Uranium	18.95	2.7 (7.479×10^{16} kg)	101	1910	2018	EIA Uranium Marketing	(Note: Mainly as triuranium octoxide, price per uranium contained.)
93	Np	Neptunium	20.45	≤ 3×10^{−12} (8.31×10^{4} kg)	660000	13500000	2003	Pomona	(Note: Periodic Table published by Pomona College Chemistry Department lists neptunium-237 as available from Oak Ridge National Laboratory at 660 USD/g plus packing costs.)
94	^{239}Pu	Plutonium-239	19.84		6490000	129000000	2019	DOE OSTI	(Note: Certified reference material sample in the form of plutonium(IV) oxide, price per plutonium-239 contained.)
95	^{241}Am	Americium-241	13.69	0	728000	9970000	1998	NWA (Note: This source also lists price of Americium-243 as 180 USD/mg, which is much higher than reported in CRC Handbook of Chemistry and Physics and used in this table.)	(Note: Available from Oak Ridge National Laboratory as reported in Nuclear Weapons FAQ.)
95	^{243}Am	Americium-243	13.69	0	750000	10300000	2004	CRC Handbook (ORNL)	
96	^{244}Cm	Curium-244	13.51	0	185000000	2.50×10^{9}	2004	CRC Handbook (ORNL)	
96	^{248}Cm	Curium-248	13.51	0	160×10^{9}	2.16×10^{12}	2004	CRC Handbook (ORNL)	
97	^{249}Bk	Berkelium-249	14.79	0	185×10^{9}	2.74×10^{12}	2004	CRC Handbook (ORNL)	
98	^{249}Cf	Californium-249	15.1	0	185×10^{9}	2.79×10^{12}	2004	CRC Handbook (ORNL)	
98	^{252}Cf	Californium-252	15.1	0	60.0×10^{9}	906×10^{9}	2004	CRC Handbook (ORNL)	
99	Es	Einsteinium	8.84	0	Not traded.				(Note: Only microgram quantities have ever been produced. Most stable known isotope has half-life of 471.7 days.)
100	Fm	Fermium	(9.7)	0	Not traded.				(Note: Only tracer amounts have ever been produced. Most stable known isotope has half-life of 100.5 days.)
101	Md	Mendelevium	(10.3)	0	Not traded.				(Note: Only around 10^{6} atoms have been produced in experiments. Most stable known isotope has half-life of 51 days.)
102	No	Nobelium	(9.9)	0	Not traded.				(Note: Only around 10^{5} atoms have been produced in experiments. Most stable known isotope has half-life of 58 minutes.)
103	Lr	Lawrencium	(15.6)	0	Not traded.				(Note: Only around 1000 atoms have been produced in experiments. Most stable known isotope has half-life of 11 hours.)
104	Rf	Rutherfordium	(23.2)	0	Not traded.				(Note: Only a few thousand atoms have been produced in experiments. Most stable known isotope has half-life of 2.5 hours.)
105	Db	Dubnium	(29.3)	0	Not traded.				(Note: Atoms of dubnium have been prepared experimentally at a rate of at most one per minute. Most stable known isotope has half-life of 29 hours.)
106	Sg	Seaborgium	(35.0)	0	Not traded.				(Note: Only tens of atoms have been produced in experiments. The most stable known isotope has half-life of 14 minutes.)
107	Bh	Bohrium	(37.1)	0	Not traded.				(Note: Only tens of atoms have been produced in experiments. Most stable known isotope has half-life of 1 minute.)
108	Hs	Hassium	(40.7)	0	Not traded.				(Note: Only tens of atoms have been produced in experiments. Most stable known isotope has half-life of 16 seconds.)
109	Mt	Meitnerium	(37.4)	0	Not traded.				(Note: Only produced in experiments on a per-atom basis. Most stable known isotope has half-life of 8 seconds.)
110	Ds	Darmstadtium	(34.8)	0	Not traded.				(Note: Only produced in experiments on a per-atom basis. Most stable known isotope has half-life of 9.6 seconds.)
111	Rg	Roentgenium	(28.7)	0	Not traded.				(Note: Only produced in experiments on a per-atom basis. Most stable known isotope has half-life of 2.1 minutes.)
112	Cn	Copernicium	(14.0)	0	Not traded.				(Note: Only tens of atoms have been produced in experiments. Most stable known isotope has half-life of 29 seconds.)
113	Nh	Nihonium	(16)	0	Not traded.				(Note: As of 2015, less than 100 atoms have been produced in experiments. Most stable known isotope has half-life of 8 seconds.)
114	Fl	Flerovium	(9.928)	0	Not traded.				(Note: As of 2015, less than 100 atoms have been produced in experiments. Most stable known isotope has half-life of 1.9 seconds.)
115	Mc	Moscovium	(13.5)	0	Not traded.				(Note: As of 2015, less than 100 atoms have been produced in experiments. Most stable known isotope has half-life of 0.65 seconds.)
116	Lv	Livermorium	(12.9)	0	Not traded.				(Note: As of 2015, less than 100 atoms have been produced in experiments. Most stable known isotope has half-life of 53 ms.)
117	Ts	Tennessine	(7.2)	0	Not traded.				(Note: As of 2015, less than 100 atoms have been produced in experiments. Most stable known isotope has half-life of 51 ms.)
118	Og	Oganesson	(7)	0	Not traded.				(Note: As of 2015, less than ten atoms have been produced in experiments. Most stable known isotope has half-life of 0.7 ms.)

== See also ==
- 2000s commodities boom
- Precious metal
