= Garfield Refining =

Philadelphia, Pennsylvania based refiner

- Company type: Private
- Industry: Refining
- Founded: 1892
- Headquarters: 810 East Cayuga Street; Philadelphia, Pennsylvania
- Area served: Worldwide
- Website: garfieldrefining.com

Garfield Refining is a Philadelphia, Pennsylvania based refinery specializing in the purchase of precious metal, including gold, silver, platinum and palladium. The company was founded in 1892 and was originally called Eastern Smelting. In 1928, it was purchased by the Garfield family. Still located in Philadelphia, Garfield's headquarters house a facility that separates precious metals from waste material, as well as an on-site assay laboratory. The family-owned and operated refinery services a variety of clients including dentists, jewelers, pawnbrokers and private sellers or buyers.

== History ==
Eastern Smelting opened its doors in 1893. The refinery was housed in a small office in downtown Philadelphia. Eastern Smelting was bought out and rebranded as Garfield Smelting and Refining in 1928. As business began to prosper and Garfield Refining accumulated more customers, the company decided to expand. In 1932, amidst The Great Depression, Garfield Smelting and Refining moved into a Philadelphia warehouse at South 18th street – a building better equipped for the industrial needs of a precious metal refinery. After moving from South 18th street, Garfield relocated to a 2-story building at 1215 Cherry St in the center of Philadelphia's business district.

After a boost to the economy in 1976 from the Bicentennial Celebration, the city decided to build a new convention center. After much citywide debate, the site known as the Reading Convention Center was selected as the location, making Garfield's headquarters the epicenter of what is now the Pennsylvania Convention Center. Garfield Refining became the first business to be relocated by the city to make way for the convention center. In March 1985, Garfield moved to its current location at 810 E Cayuga St, upgrading its melting and analytical capabilities at the same time.

In 1981, Matt Garfield took over the company as chief executive officer and built a team of employees that still remain with the refinery today.
