= Taxation of precious metals =

Precious metals are subject to taxation in most countries, because governments prefer to consider them as taxable goods or property (not money) and see these high-value items as a lucrative source of revenue. In most countries capital gains tax applies when precious metals are sold at a profit. Some countries also apply value added tax to precious metals.

== Taxation of Gold ==
=== Taxation in Germany ===
==== Value added tax ====
In Germany, investment gold is exempt from VAT under Section 25c of the German VAT Act (UStG). This regulation is based on the EU VAT Directive. The aim of the VAT exemption on investment gold in the European Union is to promote gold as a financial instrument. The tax exemption applies only to gold bars with a purity of at least 995 thousandths, and gold coins with a purity of at least 900 thousandths that were minted after 1800. Gold coins must also either be or have been legal tender and their market price must not exceed the gold value by more than 80%.

==== Income tax ====
Any realized gains from gold-related securities and gold-related exchange-traded products are subject to the flat tax in Germany. By contrast, the sale of investment gold in Germany is subject to the rules for private sales transactions in accordance with § 23 of the German Income Tax Act (EStG). Gains from the sale are tax-free if the gold was held for more than one year. Within this holding period, gains are taxable and must be taxed at the individual income tax rate, with an exemption limit of €1,000 per year. If the exemption limit is exceeded, the entire profit is taxable.

==== Differentiation from commercial trade ====
Regular trading in gold can lead to it being classified as a commercial activity. In this case, profits are subject to income tax or corporation or trade tax. In addition, VAT obligations may arise if products are not classified as investment gold.

==== Margin scheme ====
Collector coins that do not meet the requirements for tax-exempt investment gold are subject to the margin scheme under Section 25a of the German VAT Act. VAT is only levied on the difference between the purchase and selling price, which is particularly advantageous for dealers. Coins with a lower gold content or historical coins fall under this scheme.

=== Taxation in Switzerland ===
In Switzerland, investment gold is completely exempt from VAT under Article 44 of the VAT Ordinance. The exemption applies to gold bars with a minimum fineness of 995 thousandths and to gold coins that were minted after 1800, have a fineness of at least 900 thousandths and whose retail price does not exceed the material value by more than 80%. Other gold products, such as jewelry or collector's coins, that are not classified as investment gold are subject to standard VAT.

Capital gains from the sale of gold held as private assets are tax-free under Art. 16 (3) DBG. This regulation applies to both local and international investors. However, persons who regularly trade in gold can be classified as traders, in which case their profits are taxable.

=== Taxation in the United Kingdom ===
Investment gold is exempt from VAT in the UK under the Value Added Tax Act 1994 (VAT Act), Schedule 9, Group 15. This applies to gold bullion with a purity of at least 995 thousandths, as well as to certain gold coins such as Britannia and Sovereign. Capital gains are subject to Capital Gains Tax (CGT), with the exception of coins that are considered legal tender. From 2024/2025, the exemption limit is GBP 3,000, above which tax rates of 10% to 20% apply, depending on the investor's income situation.

=== Taxation in the USA ===
In the United States, the taxation of investment gold varies greatly from state to state. While some states, such as Oregon or Delaware, do not levy a sales tax on gold, other states impose a tax of up to 10%. However, many states grant exemptions for investment gold that meets certain criteria, such as a minimum fineness of 995 thousandths.

Capital gains on gold are subject to capital gains tax. Long-term gains on gold held for more than one year are taxed at 28% because gold is classified as a collectible. Short-term gains on gold held for up to one year are subject to the individual income tax rate, which can be as high as 37%.

=== Taxation in India ===
In India, investment gold is taxed at 3% through the Goods and Services Tax (GST). Additionally, gold jewelry incurs a 5% tax on making charges, which makes jewelry purchases more expensive. The GST has replaced previous taxes such as value added tax and made trade more transparent.

Capital gains are subject to capital gains tax under the Income Tax Act of 1961. Gains from the sale of gold held for less than 36 months are considered short-term and are taxed at the individual income tax rate (up to 30%). Long-term capital gains realized after holding the gold for more than 36 months are taxed at a flat rate of 20%, although indexation can be used to reduce the tax burden.

=== Taxation in China ===
In China, the purchase of gold products is subject to value added tax (VAT). Investment gold, which meets the criteria for investment purposes such as gold bars and coins, is exempt from tax under the Interim Regulations on Value-Added Tax. Other gold products such as jewelry and industrial applications are subject to a tax rate of 13%.

Profits from the sale of gold are taxed as “other income” in accordance with the Individual Income Tax Law. For private investors, a fixed tax rate of 20% applies, based on the difference between the selling and acquisition costs. By contrast, regular commercial trade is taxed at the general income tax rates of between 5% and 35%.

=== Taxation in Australia ===
Investment gold is exempt from goods and services tax (GST) in Australia under sections 38-385 of the GST Act 1999. The exemption applies to gold bullion with a purity of at least 995 thousandths and to coins that are or have been recognized as legal tender and whose selling price does not exceed the material value by more than 50%. . Other gold products such as jewelry or industrial applications are subject to the standard GST of 10%.

Gains on the sale of gold are taxed as capital gains under Division 102 of the Income Tax Assessment Act 1997 (ITAA 1997). Long-term investments held for more than 12 months benefit from a 50% tax allowance for individuals and trusts. Capital gains are added to personal income and taxed at progressive rates.

== Taxation of Silver ==
Canada, and 41 of the 50 United States, do not apply tax to bullion-quality silver. Other countries levy the full rate of VAT on silver.

Country	VAT for silver
Czech Republic	21 %
Finland	24 %
Germany	19 %
Netherlands	21 %
Poland	23 %
Slovenia	20 %
Russia	20 %
Sweden	25 %
Switzerland	8.1 %
United Kingdom	20 %
Austria	20 %

== See also ==
- Gold as an investment
- Inflation hedge
- Palladium as an investment
- Platinum as an investment
- Silver as an investment
