= Chard Coin and Bullion Dealer =

Coin and bullion dealer based in Blackpool, UK

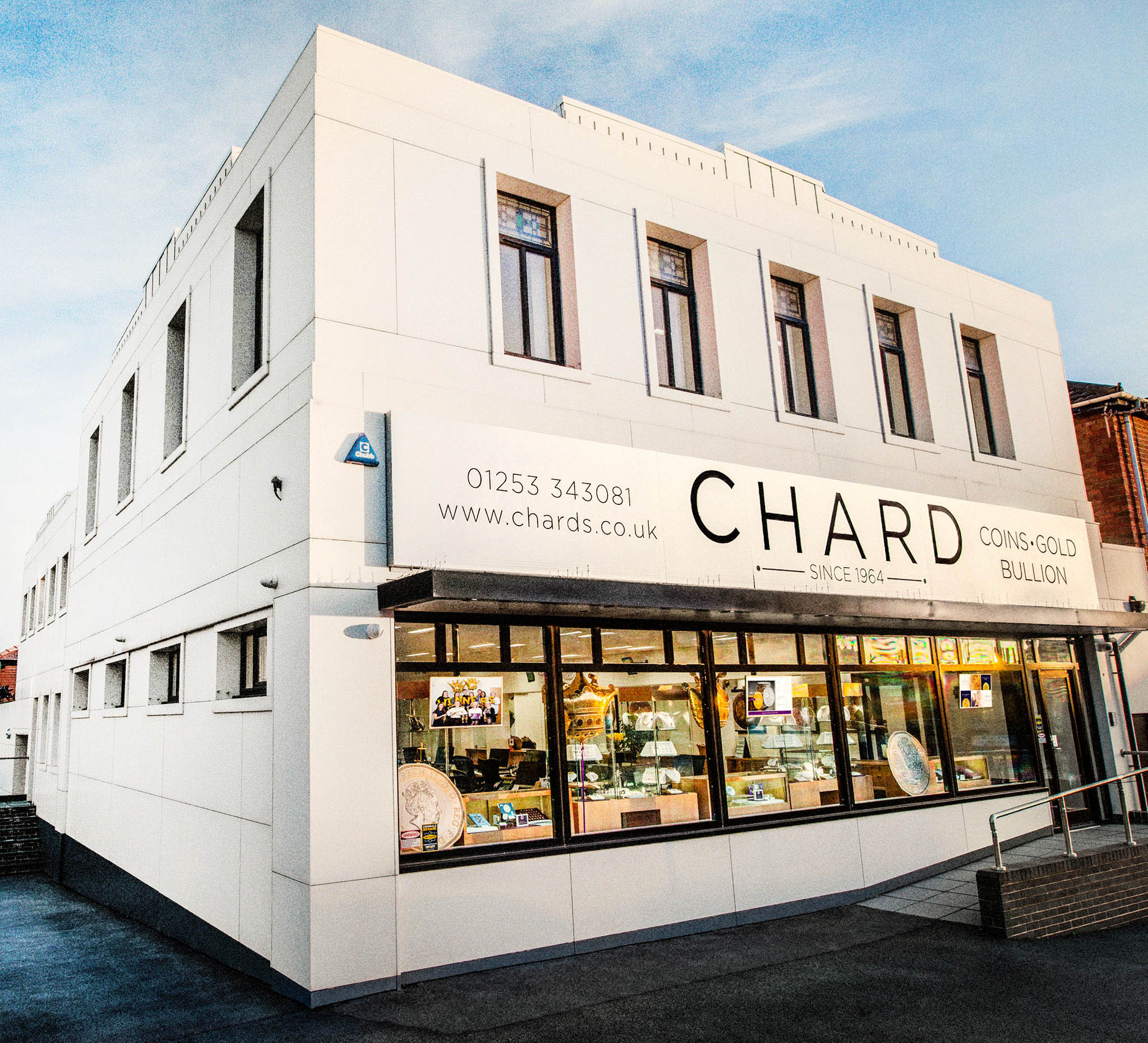
Chard Coin and Bullion Dealer

Chard (1964) Ltd, operating as Chards Coin and Bullion Dealer, is a long-standing coin and bullion dealer based in Blackpool, UK and Hatton Garden, London. They are mainly UK based and have grown from 2 members of staff to over 40 today, with many long standing team members bringing years of experience and expertise. Its coins range from ancient to modern-day issues. Originally a numismatic company, it grew into the bullion market, offering gold, silver, platinum and palladium products to an international customer base.

== History ==
Chard (1964) Ltd operates as Chards Coin and Bullion Dealer. Established in the resort town of Blackpool in 1964 by Lawrence Chard, the company at first traded shillings and other coins from Chard's grandmother's amusement arcade, but over the years Chards Coin and Bullion Dealer amassed a vast collection of world coins, coin sets, bars, medallions, stamp replicas, and other currency and collectibles. Chards Coin and Bullion Dealer provides freely available numismatic, bullion and investment advice to coin collectors and investors in person or via its websites.

In 2014, Chards Coin and Bullion celebrated its 50th anniversary with a move to 32-36 Harrowside, Blackpool. The art deco building was gutted and rebuilt to provide security. In 2024, Chards Coin and Bullion Dealer celebrated 60 years in business and opened a new showroom at 100 Hatton Garden, London, an area well known for precious metals. Chards Coin and Bullion Dealer are a LMBA full member, as full members Chards Coin and Bullion Dealer commit to secure and ethical transactions.

== Service ==
Chards Coin and Bullion Dealer sells its items, including physical bullion, in its Blackpool and London showroom and on its website. Chards Coin and Bullion Dealer specialises in British gold sovereigns and has over 5,000 dated and graded sovereigns in its collection. In addition to precious metals, Chards coin and Bullion Dealer also deals in bullion, numismatic material and scrap gold, while offering vaulted storage for customers who prefer secure holdings. The company provides both physical and digital metals, including VAT free silver and platinum (Loco Zurich), and supports investment options such as SIPPs. Chards Coin and Bullion Dealer facilitates buying and selling services and places a strong emphasis on education through blogs, YouTube and social media channels, helping customers make informed decisions about coins and bullion.

== Awards ==
Chards Coin and Bullion Dealer was awarded the UK Bullion Dealer of the Year award by Bullion Directory in 2018, 2017, 2016 and 2015. It has also been named Numismatic Dealer of the Year and eCommerce Dealer of the Year multiple times.
