= Precious metal =

Rare, naturally occurring metallic chemical element of high economic and cultural value

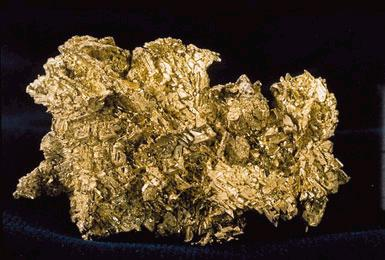
Gold nugget

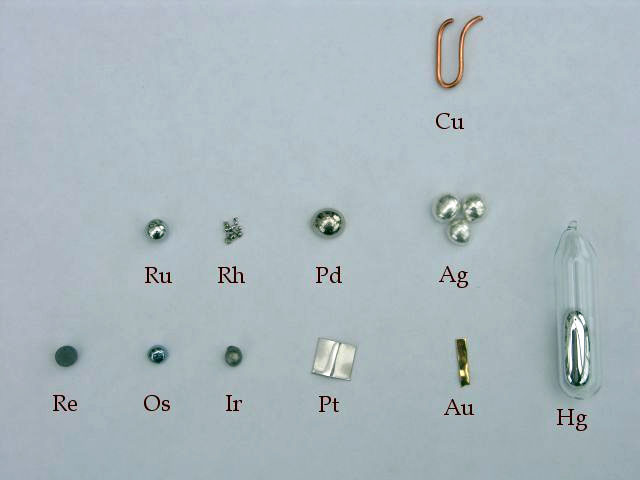
A selection of precious metal elements: copper, ruthenium, rhodium, palladium, silver, rhenium, osmium, iridium, platinum, gold and mercury. They are labeled and arranged by their location on the periodic table.

Precious metals are rare, naturally occurring metallic minerals of high economic value. Precious metals, particularly the noble metals, are more corrosion resistant and less chemically reactive than most elements. They are usually ductile and have a high lustre. Historically, precious metals were important as currency but they are now regarded mainly as investment and industrial raw materials. Gold, silver, platinum, and palladium each have an ISO 4217 currency code.

The best known precious metals are the precious coinage metals, which are gold and silver. Although both have industrial uses, they are better known for their uses in art, jewelry, and coinage. Other precious metals include the platinum group metals: ruthenium, rhodium, palladium, osmium, iridium, and platinum, of which platinum is the most widely traded. The demand for precious metals is driven not only by their practical use but also by their role as investments and a store of value. Historically, precious metals have commanded much higher prices than common industrial metals.

== Bullion ==
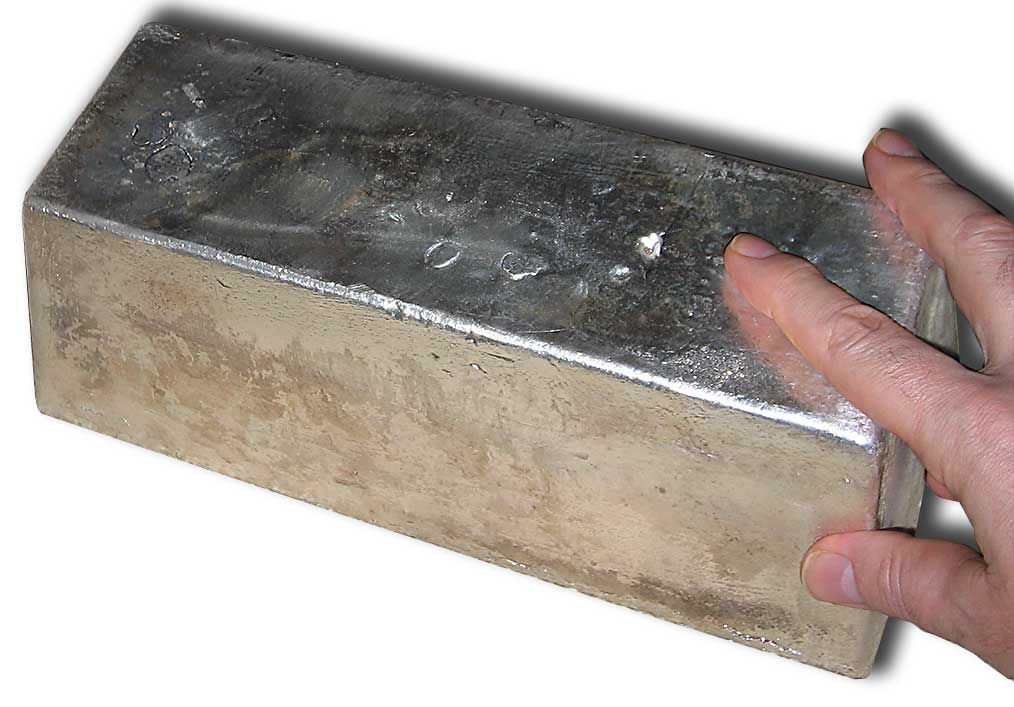
1,000 oz silver bar

A metal is deemed to be precious if it is rare. The discovery of new sources of ore or improvements in mining or refining processes may cause the value of a precious metal to diminish. The status of a "precious" metal can also be determined by high demand or market value. Precious metals in bulk form are known as bullion and are traded on international bullion markets. Bullion metals may be cast into ingots or minted into coins. The defining attribute of bullion is that it is valued by its mass and purity rather than by a face value as money.

=== Purity and mass ===
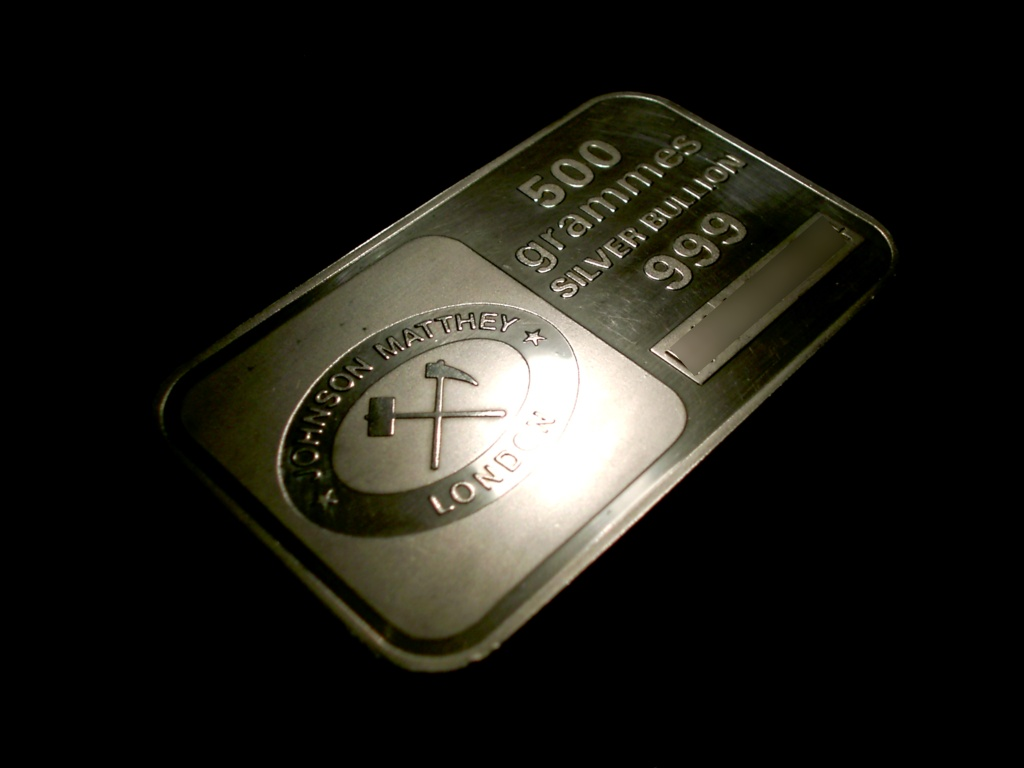
500 g silver bullion bar produced by Johnson Matthey

The level of purity varies from issue to issue. "Three nines" (99.9%) purity is common. The purest mass-produced bullion coins are in the Canadian Gold Maple Leaf series, which go up to 99.999% purity. A 100% pure bullion is nearly impossible: as the percentage of impurities diminishes, it becomes progressively more difficult to purify the metal further. Historically, coins had a certain amount of weight of alloy, with the purity a local standard. The Krugerrand is the first modern example of measuring in "pure gold": it should contain at least 12/11 ounces of at least 11/12 pure gold. Other bullion coins (for example the British Sovereign) show neither the purity nor the fine-gold weight on the coin but are recognized and consistent in their composition. Many coins historically showed a denomination in currency (example: American double eagle: $20).

=== Coinage ===
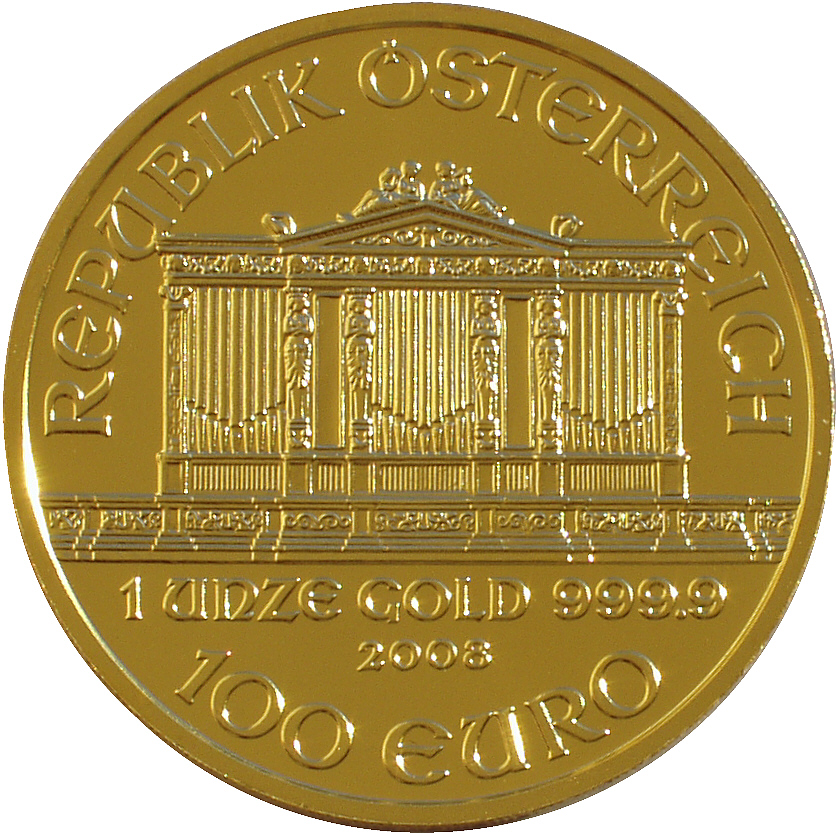
1 oz Vienna Philharmonic gold coin

Many nations mint bullion coins. Although nominally issued as legal tender, these coins' face value as currency is far below their value as bullion. For instance, Canada mints a gold bullion coin (the Gold Maple Leaf) at a face value of $50 containing one troy ounce (31.1035 g) of gold, as of January 2022. The USD to CAD exchange rate averaged 1.129 in July 2009 according to OANDA Historical Exchange Rates. Although the exact moment that the $1,075 figure was determined is unknown, it may be considered a reasonable value for the time. Bullion coins' minting by national governments gives them some numismatic value in addition to their bullion value, as well as certifying their purity.

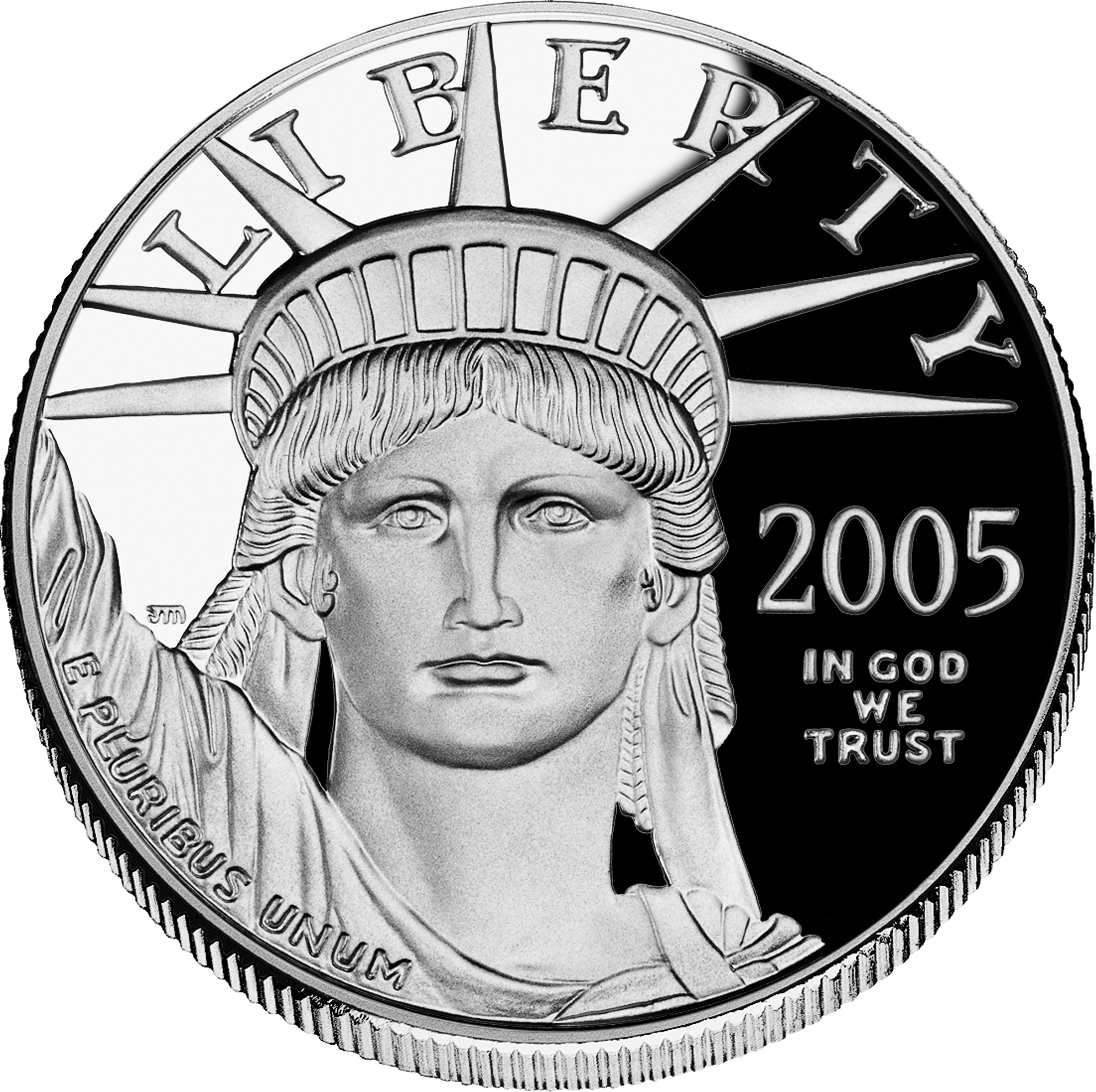
American Platinum Eagle bullion coin

One of the largest bullion coins in the world was the 10,000-dollar Australian Gold Nugget coin minted in Australia, which consists of a full kilogram of 99.9% pure gold. In 2012, the Perth Mint produced a 1-tonne coin of 99.99% pure gold with a face value of $1 million AUD, making it the largest minted coin in the world with a gold value of around $50 million AUD. China has produced coins in very limited quantities (less than 20 pieces minted) that exceed 8 kilograms (260 ozt) of gold. Austria has minted a coin containing 31 kg of gold (the Vienna Philharmonic Coin minted in 2004 with a face value of 100,000 euro). As a stunt to publicise the 99.999% pure one-ounce Canadian Gold Maple Leaf series, in 2007 the Royal Canadian Mint made a 100 kg 99.999% gold coin, with a face value of $1 million, and now manufactures them to order, but at a substantial premium over the market value of the gold.

The Reserve Bank of Zimbabwe mints the gold Mosi-oa-Tunya (coin) which is recognized as legal tender at the market value for its gold content.

=== Economic use ===
Gold and silver, and sometimes other precious metals, are often seen as defensive assets against both inflation and economic downturn. The gold-to-silver ratio, which measures how many ounces of silver are needed to purchase one ounce of gold, is one of the oldest continuously tracked price relationships and is widely used by investors to assess relative value between the two metals. Silver coins have become popular with collectors due to their relative affordability, and, unlike most gold and platinum issues, which are valued based upon the markets, silver issues are more often valued as collectables, at far higher than their bullion value.

=== Industrial use ===
Platinum and palladium are key catalysts in hydrogenation reactions and emission-reducing catalytic converters, while gold is used in oxidation reactions and nanotechnology due to its stability. Platinum group metals (PGMs) have been used in the production of sulfuric and nitric acid for centuries. Additionally, gold and silver nanoparticles are used in biosensors and solar cells, underscoring their value in sustainable technologies.

== Aluminium ==
Aluminium is now commonplace but was considered to be a precious metal until the late 1800s. Although aluminium is the third most abundant element and the most abundant metal in the Earth's crust, it was at first found to be exceedingly difficult to extract the metal from its various non-metallic ores. The great expense of refining the metal made the small available quantity of pure aluminium more valuable than gold. Bars of aluminium were exhibited at the Exposition Universelle of 1855, and Napoleon III's most important guests were given aluminium cutlery, while those less worthy dined with mere silver. In 1884, the pyramidal capstone of the Washington Monument was cast of 100 ounces of pure aluminium. By that time, aluminium was as expensive as silver. The statue of Anteros atop the Shaftesbury Memorial Fountain (1885–1893) in London's Piccadilly Circus is also of cast aluminium. Over time, however, the price of the metal has dropped. The dawn of commercial electric generation in 1882 and the invention of the Hall–Héroult process in 1886 caused the price of aluminium to drop substantially over a short period of time.

== Rough world market value ($/kg) ==
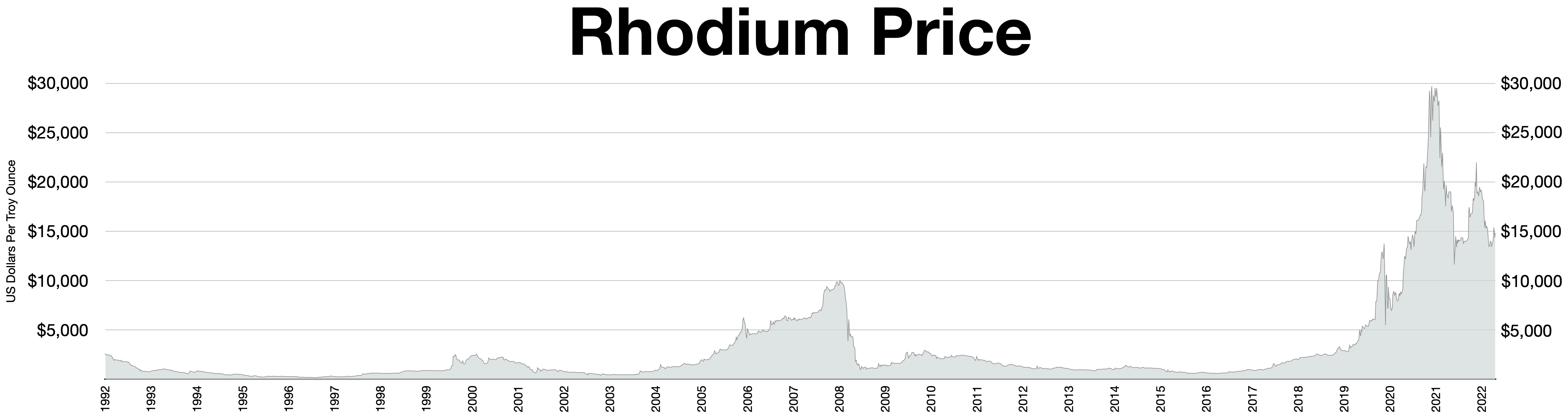
Rhodium daily price 1992-2022

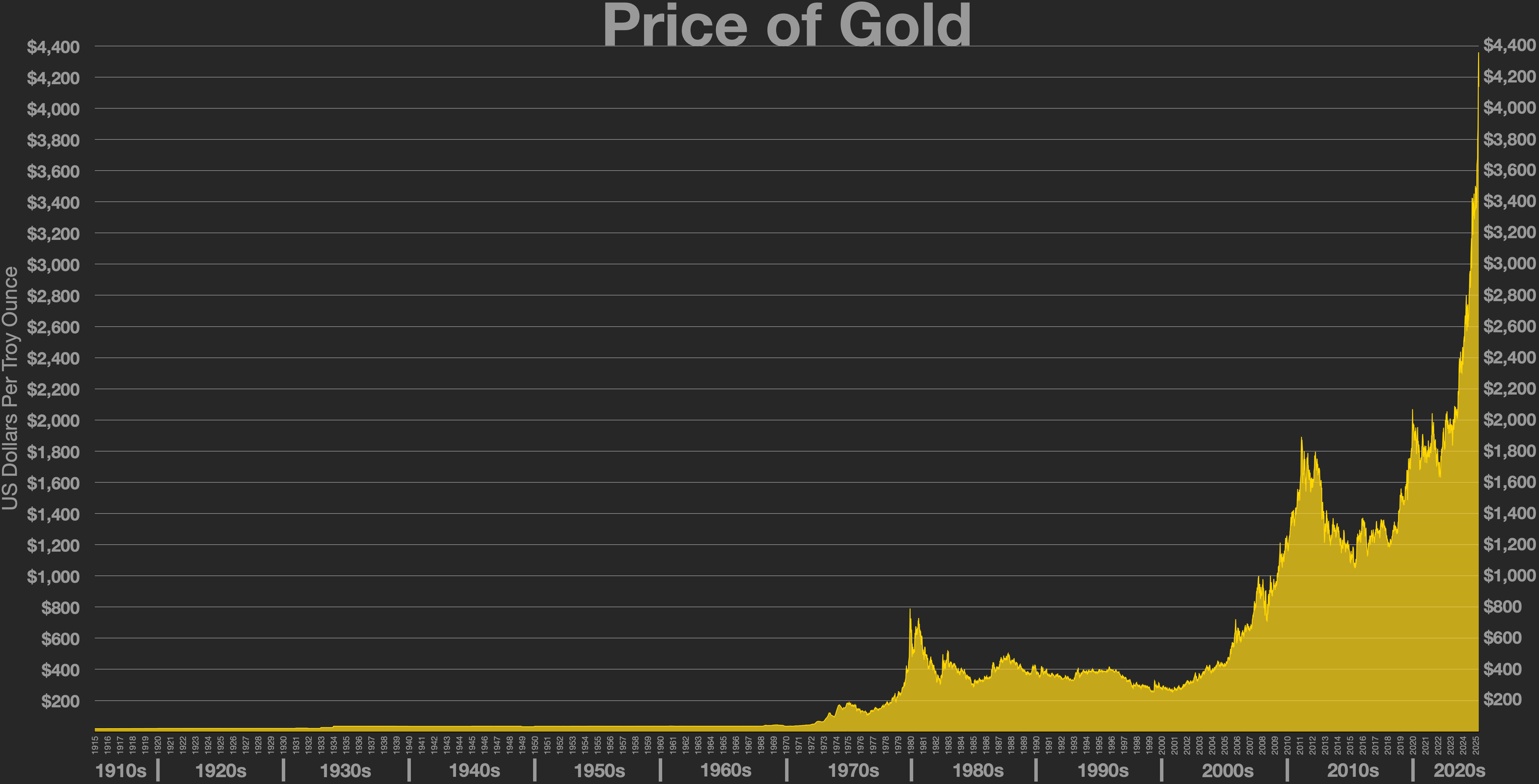
Price of gold 1915-2022

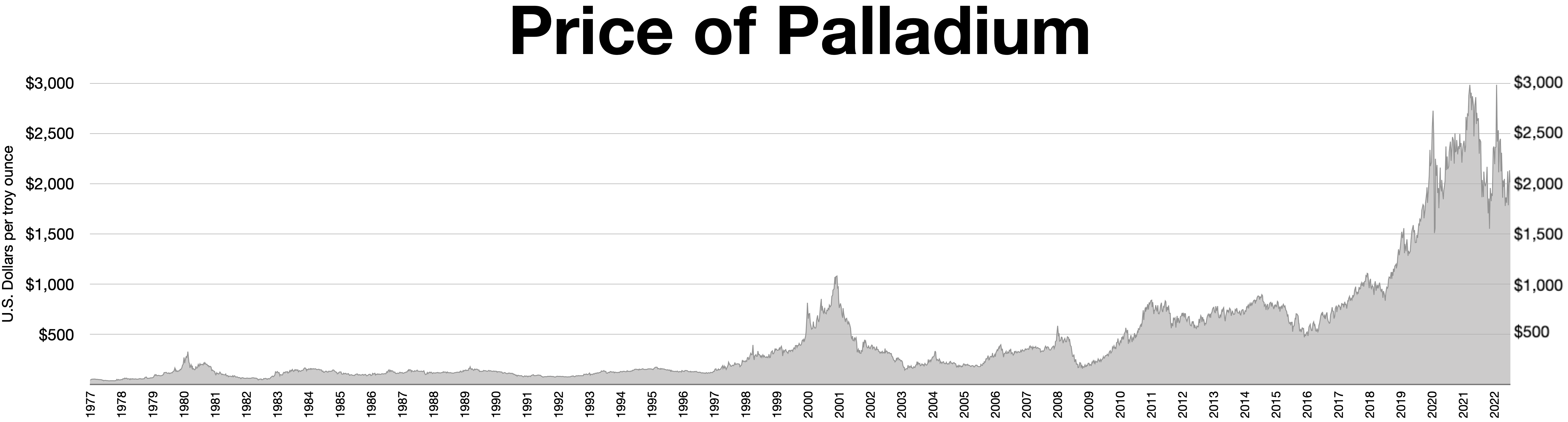
Palladium prices 1977-2022

Metal		Mass abundance (ppb)	Metal price (US$/kg)					
Name	Symbol	Mass abundance (ppb)	10 Apr 2009	22 Jul 2009	7 Jan 2010	31 Dec 2014	16 Jul 2018	2 Mar 2023
Ruthenium	Ru	1	2,290	2,730	5,562	1,865	8,423	14,950
Rhodium	Rh	1	39,680	46,200	88,415	39,641	77,804	302,220
Palladium	Pd	15	8,430	8,140	13,632	25,559	32,205	46,440
Silver	Ag	75	437	439	588	441	556	670
Indium	In	50			520			
Tellurium	Te	1			158.70			
Rhenium	Re	0.7	7,400	7,000	6,250	2,425		
Osmium	Os	1.5	13,400	12,200	12,217	12,217		
Iridium	Ir	1	14,100	12,960	13,117	15,432	46,940	147,890
Platinum	Pt	5	42,681	37,650	87,741	38,902	28,960	31,010
Gold	Au	4	31,100	30,590	24,317	38,130	43,764	59,040
Mercury	Hg	85		18.90	15.95			
Bismuth	Bi	8.5		15.40	18.19			

== See also ==
- Alchemy
- Critical Raw Materials Act
- Gemstone
- Gold as an investment
- Hallmark
- List of bullion dealers
- Metallism
- Metallurgical assay
- Native Elements
- Noble metal
- Palladium as an investment
- Platinum as an investment
- Prices of chemical elements
- Rare-earth element
- Silver as an investment
- Synthesis of precious metals (precious metal transformation)
- Taxation of precious metals
- Troy weight
