= Baird & Co =

British bullion merchant company

Coordinates: 51°31′15.68″N 0°6′30.48″W

Baird & Co.
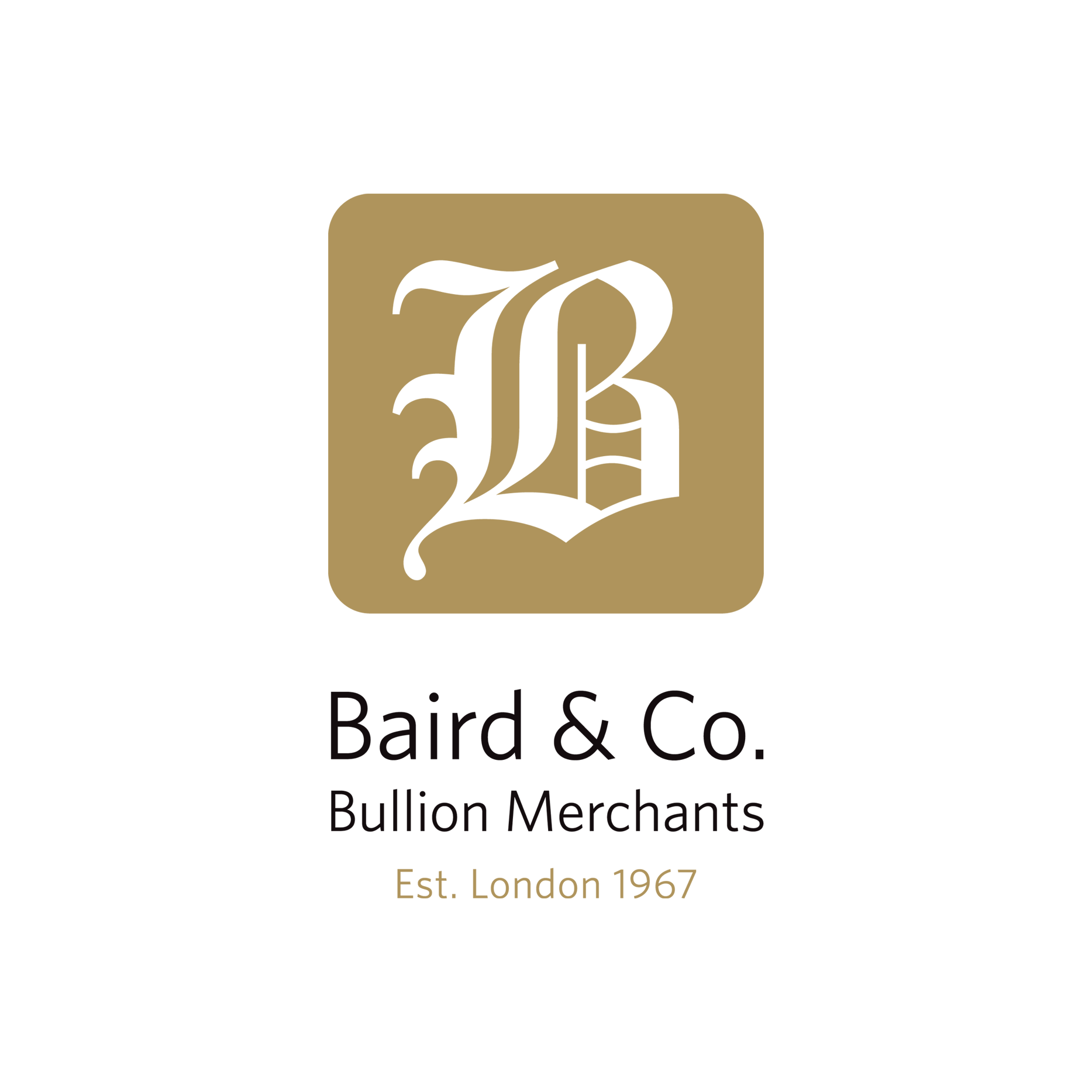

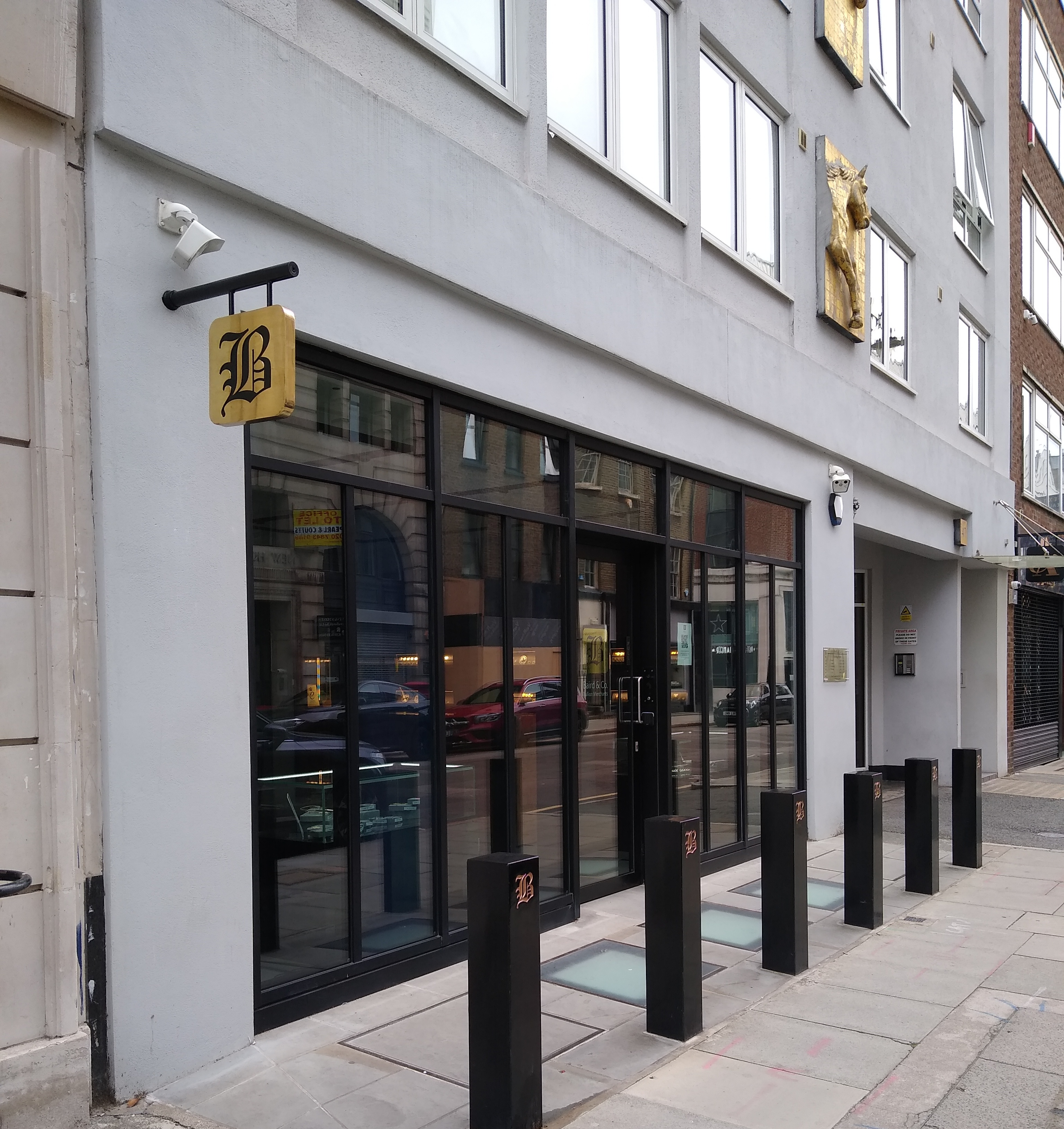
- Headquarters in London
- Type: Private company
- Industry: Gold smith
- Founded: 1967; 59 years ago
- Founder: Tony Baird
- Headquarters: London, United Kingdom
- Products: Bullion, Jewellery, Planchets
- Number of employees: +50 (2020)
- Website: www.bairdmint.com

Baird & Co. is a British gold refiner and the full-service bullion merchant in the United Kingdom. Founded by Tony Baird in 1967, Baird & Co. initially dealt in numismatic coins expanding into bullion bars and jewellery as time progressed.

The company is headquartered in Hatton Garden, London, operating out of a 30,000 sq foot high-security refinery in Beckton and an international branch in Singapore.

The company primarily trades gold, silver, platinum, palladium and rhodium bars and numismatic coins. All are offered in a range of weights and sizes aimed at private investors, collectors and institutional clients. Baird and Co. also provides vaulting facilities, as well as manufacturing specialist alloys for industrial use.

== History ==
=== Founder and company foundation ===
The company's founder Antony Stephen Baird was born in 1942 at the family ancestral home in Lanarkshire, Scotland. Shortly, after World War II, the family moved to London and he began bartering coins at school. However, it was not until 1967, and the launch of the South African krugerrand, that he took up coin dealing as a full-time occupation.

By the mid-70s Tony had established a permanent office in Stratford and would often drive to Switzerland in his E-Type Jaguar to collect thousands of gold coins. On 1 April 1982 VAT was applied to gold coins at the going rate of 15% (it was subsequently removed on 1 January 2000) and the following collapse of the UK gold coin market encouraged Tony to diversify into other gold products, particularly jewellery manufacturing and producing gold bars.

1987 saw the opening of their first branch in Hatton Garden where they provided over the counter cash trade. Baird & Co. moved to their brand new refinery in 2008 to accommodate the Olympics in Stratford. Baird & Co. remains privately owned. Tony Baird died on 12 April 2015. He is survived by his wife Lorena and two sons Alex and Carlos. His funeral was held on 10 September 2015 and was attended by several LBMA members.

=== Development 1996 - Present ===
The company has been offering precious metal coins and bars online via its website since 1996, making it the first website of its kind in the industry and one of the first dynamic websites in the UK.

In 2000 Baird & Co. gained entry to the London Bullion Market Association (LBMA) and remains a full member. Between 2011 and 2013 Baird & Co. ranked in the Sunday Times Fast Track 100, Top Track 250 and Profit Track 100 league tables of the fastest-growing private companies in the UK and also featured in the Real Business Hot 100.

In 2012 Baird & Co, released the world's first commercial rhodium investment bar and partnered with the nation of Tuvalu in 2018 to produce the world's first legal tender rhodium coin; The Tuvalu South Sea Dragon.

Baird & Co. became an official distributor of The Royal Mint in 2016 and were winners of the Queen's Enterprise Award for Business in the international trade category in 2018.

== See also ==
- Gold as an investment
- Gold coin
- Numismatic
- Smelter
