= FOB (shipping) =

International Chamber of Commerce term

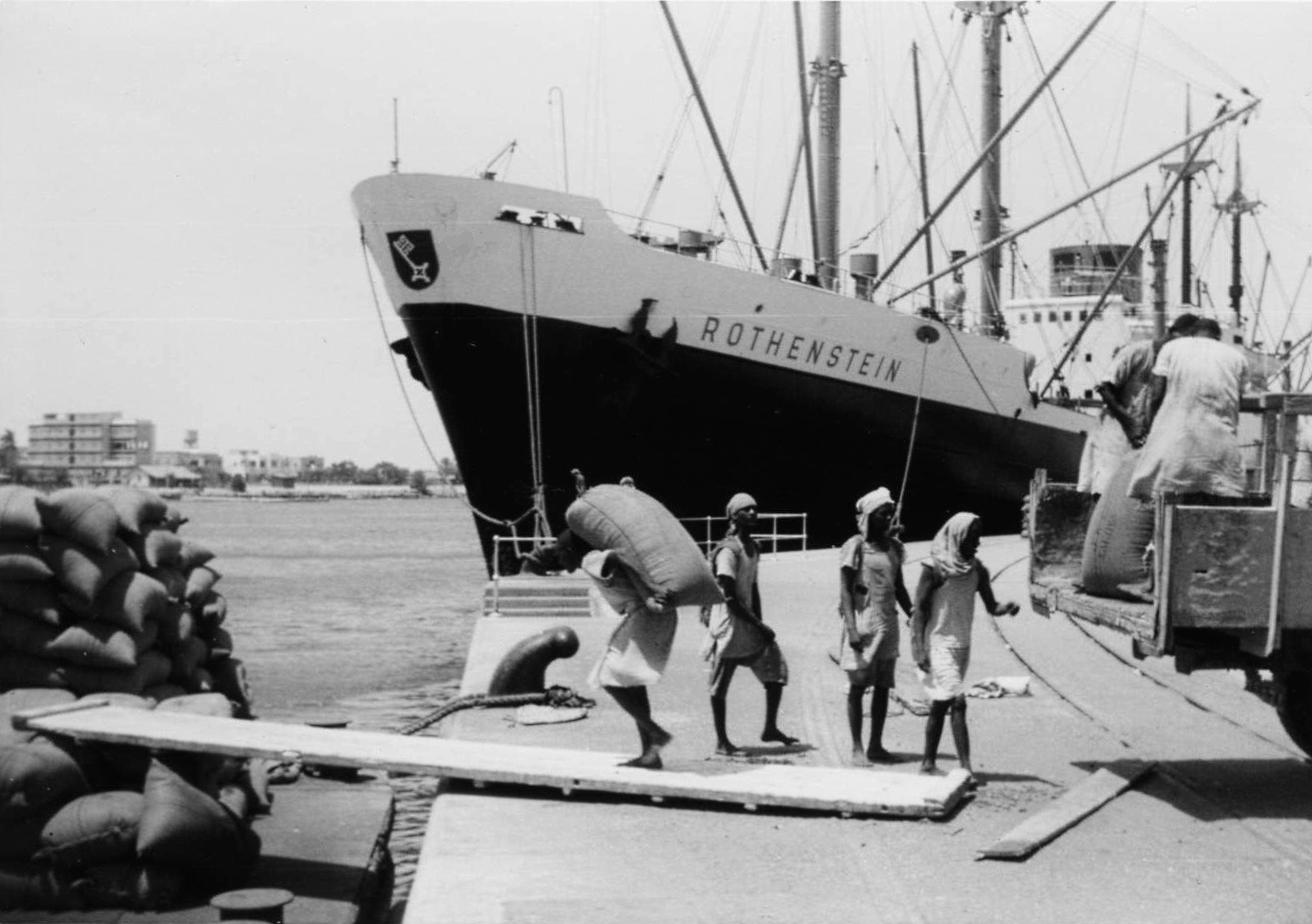
Dockers loading bagged cargo

FOB (free on board) is a term in international commercial law specifying at what point respective obligations, costs, and risk involved in the delivery of goods shift from the seller to the buyer under the Incoterms standard published by the International Chamber of Commerce. FOB is only used in non-containerized sea freight or inland waterway transport. As with all Incoterms, FOB does not define the point at which ownership of the goods is transferred.

The term FOB is also used in modern domestic shipping within North America to describe the point at which a seller is no longer responsible for shipping costs.

Ownership of a cargo is independent of Incoterms, which relate to delivery and risk. In international trade, ownership of the cargo is defined by the contract of sale and the bill of lading or waybill.

== Historical usage ==
The term "free on board", or "f.o.b." was used historically in relation to the transfer of risk from seller to buyer as goods are shipped. There appears to have been an assumption that property and risk would pass from the seller to the buyer at the same time. In the case of Browne v Hare, settled in the Court of Exchequer Chamber in 1858, it was noted that a shipper's attempt to reserve title after shipment would have constituted a breach of the contract's f.o.b. terms:

If, at the time the oil was shipped at Rotterdam, the plaintiffs had intended to continue their ownership, and had taken the bill of lading in the terms in which it was made for the purpose of continuing the ownership and exercising dominion over the oil, they would in our opinion have broken their contract to ship the oil "free on board", and the property would not have passed to the defendants; but if when they shipped the oil they intended to perform their contract and deliver it "free on board" for the defendants, we think they did perform it, and the property in the oil passed from them to the defendants.

Browne also made an assumption that in an earlier case, Wait v Baker (1848), the seller of a supply of barley carried on f.o.b. terms, who had delivered to a third party, was in breach of their contract with the buyer. Judge Mackenzie Chalmers also notes Van Casteel v Booker (1848), Turner v Liverpool Docks (1851), and Gabarron v Kreeft (1875) as cases which show that property passes "on board" to the buyer.

Later cases such as Mirabita v Ottoman Imperial Bank allowed that a contract could make the transfer of property subject to payment, so long as the intention behind this reservation was to secure payment and not to prevent transfer of possession.

== Incoterms ==
Under the Incoterms (2020) standard published by the International Chamber of Commerce, FOB is only used in sea freight and stands for "Free On Board". The term is always used in conjunction with a port of loading. Destination need not be specified and may be left "free".

Indicating "FOB port" means that the seller pays for transportation of the goods to the port of shipment, plus loading costs. The buyer pays the cost of marine freight transport, insurance, unloading, and transportation from the arrival port to the final destination. The passing of risks occurs when the goods are loaded on board at the port of shipment. For example, "FOB Vancouver" indicates that the seller will pay for transportation of the goods to the port of Vancouver, and the cost of loading the goods on to the cargo ship (this includes inland haulage, customs clearance, origin documentation charges, demurrage if any, origin port handling charges, in this case Vancouver). The buyer pays for all costs beyond that point, including unloading. Responsibility for the goods is with the seller until the goods are loaded on board the ship. Once the cargo is on board, the buyer assumes the risk.

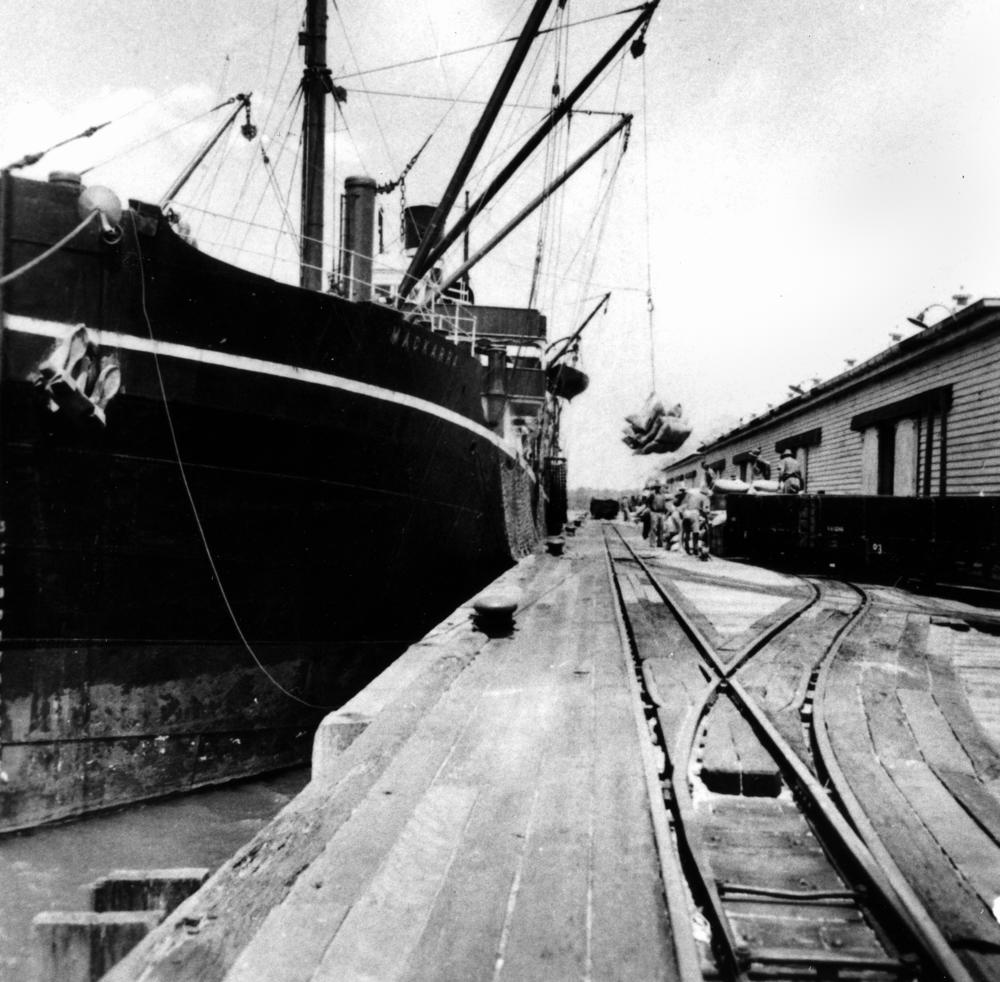
Ship loading at a wharf

The use of "FOB" originated in the days of sailing ships. When the ICC first wrote their guidelines for the use of the term in 1936, the ship's rail was still relevant, as goods were often passed over the rail by hand. In 1954, in the case of Pyrene Co. Ltd. v. Scindia Steam Navigation Co. Ltd., Justice Devlin, ruling on a matter relating to liability under an FOB contract, described the situation thus:

Only the most enthusiastic lawyer could watch with satisfaction the spectacle of liabilities shifting uneasily as the cargo sways at the end of a derrick across a notional perpendicular projecting from the ship's rail.

In the modern era of containerization, the term "ship's rail" is somewhat archaic for trade purposes, as with a sealed shipping container, there is no way of establishing when damage occurred after the container has been sealed. The standards have noted this. Incoterms 1990 stated

When the ship's rail serves no practical purpose, such as in the case of roll-on/roll-off or container traffic, the FCA term is more appropriate to use.

Incoterms 2000 adopted the wording

If the parties do not intend to deliver the goods across the ship's rail, the FCA term should be used.

The phrase passing the ship's rail is no longer in use, having been dropped from the FOB Incoterm in the 2010 revision.

Due to potential confusion with domestic North American usage of "FOB", it is recommended that the use of Incoterms be explicitly specified, along with the edition of the standard. For example, "FOB New York (Incoterms 2000)". Incoterms apply to both international trade and domestic trade, as of the 2010 revision.

== North America ==
In North America, FOB is written into a sales agreement to determine where the liability responsibility for the goods transfers from the seller to the buyer. FOB stands for "Free On Board". There is no line item payment by the buyer for the cost of getting the goods onto the transport. There are two possibilities: "FOB origin", or "FOB destination". "FOB origin" means the transfer occurs as soon as the goods are safely on board the transport. "FOB destination" means the transfer occurs the moment the goods are removed from the transport at the destination. "FOB origin" (also sometimes phrased as "FOB shipping" or "FOB shipping point") indicates that the sale is considered complete at the seller's shipping dock, and thus the buyer of the goods is responsible for freight costs and liability during transport. With "FOB destination", the sale is complete at the buyer's doorstep and the seller is responsible for freight costs and liability during transport.

The two terms have a specific meaning in commercial law and cannot be altered. But the FOB terms do not need to be used, and often are not. In this case the specific terms of the agreement can vary widely, in particular which party, buyer or seller, pays for the loading costs and shipment costs, and/or where responsibility for the goods is transferred. The last distinction is important for determining liability or risk of loss for goods lost or damaged in transit from the seller to the buyer.

For example, a person in Miami purchasing equipment from a manufacturer in Chicago could receive a price quote of "$5000 FOB Chicago", which would indicate that the buyer would be responsible for the shipping from Chicago to Miami. If the same seller issued a price quote of "$5000 FOB Miami", then the seller would cover shipping to the buyer's location.

International shipments typically use "FOB" as defined by the Incoterms standards, where it always stands for "Free On Board". Domestic shipments within the United States or Canada often use a different meaning, specific to North America, which is inconsistent with the Incoterms standards.

North American FOB usage corresponds to Incoterms approximately as follows:

North America	Incoterms
FOB shipping point or FOB shipping point, freight collect	FCA shipping point
FOB shipping point, freight prepaid	CPT destination
FOB destination or FOB destination, freight prepaid	DAP destination

A related but separate term "CAP" ("customer-arranged pickup") is used to denote that the buyer will arrange a carrier of their choice to pick the goods up at the seller's premises, and the liability for any damage or loss belongs to the buyer.

Although FOB has long been stated as "Freight On Board" in sales contract terminology, this should be avoided as it does not precisely conform to the meaning of the acronym as specified in the UCC.

Sometimes FOB is used in sales to retain commission by the outside sales representative. It is unclear where this originated.

== Accounting and auditing ==
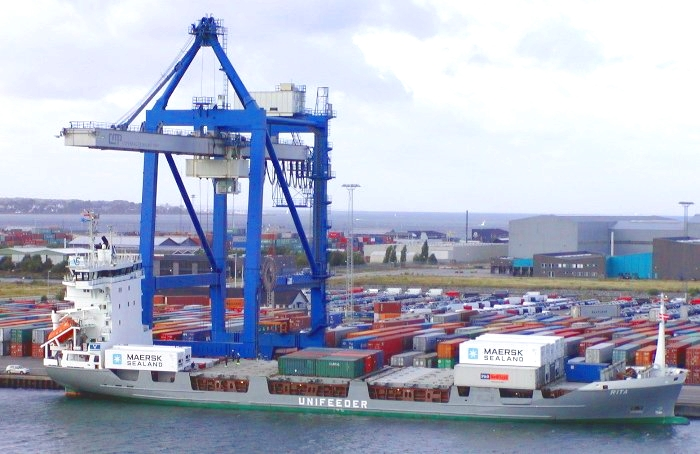
Container ship loading

In the past, the FOB point determined when title transferred for goods. For example, at year- and period-end goods in transit under "FOB destination" (North American usage) appear on the seller's balance sheet but not in the buyer's balance sheet, as the risk and rewards of ownership change to the buyer at the "destination" port.

It is much easier to determine when title transfers by referring to the agreed upon terms and conditions of the transaction; typically, title passes with risk of loss. The transfer of title may occur at a different time (or event) than the FOB shipping term. The transfer of title is the element of revenue that determines who owns the goods and the applicable value.

Import fees when they reach the border of one country to enter the other country under the conditions of FOB destination are due at the customs port of the destination country.

With the advent of e-commerce, most commercial electronic transactions occur under the terms of "FOB shipping point" or "FCA shipping point".

== "Freight On Board" ==
Some sources claim that FOB stands for "Freight On Board". This is not the case. The term "Freight On Board" is not mentioned in any version of Incoterms, and is not defined by the Uniform Commercial Code in the USA. Further to that, it has been found in the US court system that "Freight On Board" is not a recognized industry term. Use of the term "Freight On Board" in contracts is therefore very likely to cause confusion.
