= Emirates Gold =

Metal company

- Founded: 1992
- Founder: Mohamed Sharkachi
- Headquarters: Dubai, United Arab Emirates
- Products: Bullion, Investment Bars, Customized Coins
- Revenue: ▲NA (2016–17)
- Operating income: ▲NA (2016–17)
- Net income: ▲NA (2016-17)
- Total assets: ▲NA (2016–17)
- Website: emiratesgold.ae

Emirates Gold is a precious metal refinery, bullion manufacturer, and mint based in Dubai, United Arab Emirates. Working primarily with gold and silver, the company produces its own bullion (such as 995 and 999.9 purity kilobars) which is recognized internationally, as well as other products such as investment bars and customized coins and medals.

Founded in 1992, it is one of the largest refineries in the Middle East. In 2017 at the Dubai Shopping Festival, Emirates Gold created the world's largest display of gold with 250 kilograms (550 lb) of gold bars.

Following the death of its founder, Emirates Gold was sold in early 2022. Further, in September 2024, Emirates Gold was acquired by Bright East Holding 1, a licensed entity within the Abu Dhabi Global Market (ADGM).
