= Gold Age =

Defunct digital currency exchange

The Gold Age was a digital currency exchange and one of the first independent e-gold exchanges. Gold Age was a registered legal corporate entity of Panama. The Gold Age was launched in 1999 and closed down by regulators in 2006.

== Background ==
Gold Age was used to buy and sell and trade the following digital gold currencies: e-gold, e-Bullion, and 1mdc.

Gold Age's fees for exchanging fiat currency into digital gold currency ranged from 4 percent to 1.75 percent, depending on the amount exchanged and if the client was an Inner Circle Member. Gold Age was an accredited and gold awarded member of the Global Digital Currency Association (GDCA).

== U.S. Secret Service raid, March 2001 ==
On March 12, 2001, then Gold Age owner Parker Bradley was detained at his place of business in Syracuse, New York by US Secret Service agents investigating credit card fraud. Bradley claimed he has stopped accepting credit cards in 2000 due to too many people used stolen credit cards when conducting business with him. "The interrogation became less about me and more about politics and e-gold," Bradley said. "They were trying to get me to blame e-gold for fraud. Just to be blunt, these guys have no clue about how e-commerce works, how e-gold works or what I was doing."

In 2002 Bradley sold the business to new owners.

== Arrest of Gold Age principals, July 2006 ==
On July 27, 2006 the New York County District Attorney's office announced the indictment of Arthur Budovsky and Vladimir Kats for allegedly violating Article 13-B of New York State Banking Law, after a six month sting operation that began in January 2006. Budovsky and Kats declared their innocence saying "We believe this is a legitimate business practice, which does not require a state license." Represented by Igor Niman, they were found guilty and sentenced to five years in prison. The sentence reduced to five years probation.

Budovsky subsequently fled the country and founded Liberty Reserve to perform a similar service as Gold Age.
