= Currencies of Puerto Rico =

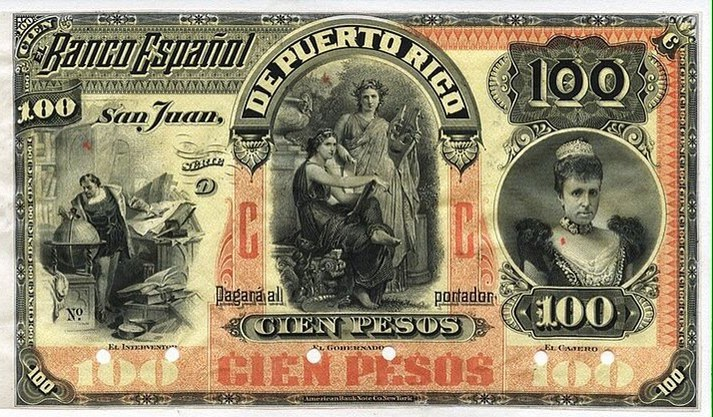
FRONT - 100 Pesos bank note of 1894 – Banco Español de Puerto Rico.

The currencies of Puerto Rico closely follow the historic development of the territory. As a Province of Spain (Autonomous Community) and a territory of the United States, Puerto Rico was granted the use of both foreign and provincial currencies. Following the Spanish colonization in 1508, Puerto Rico became an important port, with its own supply of gold. However, as the mineral reserves ran empty within the century, the archipelago's economy suffered. The Spanish Crown issued the Situado Mexicano, which meant that a semi-regular shipment of gold from the Viceroyalty of New Spain would be sent to the island, as a way to provide economic support. Between 1636 and 1637, Philip IV of Spain imposed a tax which had to be paid using a revenue stamp. Inspired by this, Puerto Rico began producing banknotes in 1766, becoming the first Overseas Province to print 8-real banknotes in the Spanish Empire and which in the Spanish government's approval of subsequent issues.

The situado was discontinued during the 19th century, creating an economic crisis, as a result of Mexico gaining its independence from Spain. Salvador Meléndez Bruna, the colonial governor in office, ordered the issue of provincial banknotes, creating the Puerto Rican peso. However, printing of these banknotes ceased after 1815. During the following decades, foreign coins became the widespread currency. In the 1860s and 1870s, banknotes reemerged. On February 1, 1890, the Banco Español de Puerto Rico was inaugurated and began issuing banknotes. The bank designed four series and placed three in circulation under Spanish rule. In 1895, a Royal Decree ordered the production of provincial peso coins.

On August 13, 1898, the Spanish–American War ended with Spain ceding Puerto Rico to the United States. The Banco Español de Puerto Rico was renamed Bank of Puerto Rico and issued bills equivalent to the United States dollar, creating the Puerto Rican dollar. In 1902, the First National Bank of Puerto Rico issued banknotes in a parallel manner. Two more series were issued until 1913. After Puerto Rico's economy and monetary system were fully integrated into the United States' economic and monetary system, the Puerto Rican dollars were redeemed for those issued by the United States Treasury. The peso and dollar have been followed by other contemporary issues, including commemorative banknotes, private currency, and a quarter coin designed with Fort San Felipe del Morro in the face.

== Early licenses issued by the Spanish Crown ==
After Juan Ponce de León began the colonization process of Puerto Rico, the archipelago became a strategic military location, used by Spain to protect its colonies and possessions in America. Vessels used it as the main point for resupplying before attempting long voyages and trading became a key part of the economy. However, when the mines and rivers in the main island of Puerto Rico, then known as San Juan Bautista, were depleted Puerto Rico began suffering from a shortage of gold and its income was reduced drastically, precipitating a recession. Beginning in the 16th century, the Spanish Crown was forced to issue a monetary support decree to the archipelago known as situado, which was supplied by the Royal banks in Central America, particularly Mexico. However, this aid failed to arrive often due to piracy and shipwrecks, contributing to the economical instability and an increase of contraband in Puerto Rico. This was exacerbated by other factors, including the costs of running an efficient military and a lack of commercial prosperity. Natural conditions and disasters also contributed, multiplying the costs of maintaining fortresses while hurricanes damaged haciendas, destroying crops and shortening the amount of laborers. Most of the coins available were silver reales, colloquially known as "pieces of eight".

Municipalities suffered most, being forced to implement taxes, including the alcaba del viento (lit. "wind tax"), which was imposed on foreign suppliers. However, these taxes barely helped, this was because each one had to receive a Royal certification, a bureaucratic procedure which usually lasted several years. Once they reached an established deadline, the process would have to be repeated, taking an extended amount of time. From January 1, 1636, to December 15, 1637, Philip IV of Spain imposed an obligatory payment to the treasuries in Puerto Rico. The debt was to be paid with currency symbolized by legalized papers bearing a Royal seal. Researchers believe that the use of these documents had an impact in the production of banknotes in Puerto Rico. In due time, these documents would be short in supply upon their arrival, in such cases the government officials would stamp the current date into old papers.

To deal with this situation, a Royal Decree was approved on August 22, 1766, authorizing the first issue of paper notes in the American colonies. Pedro Tomás de Cordova and Humberto Burzio claim in their research that Puerto Rico was the first place in America to print 8-real, achieving it during that year. Thus, putting Puerto Rico ahead by two decades before Cuba (1781), Hispaniola (1782) and even Spain (1783). Both researchers divided the first two types of banknotes issued, the two varieties were classified as "issued" and "printed". Although both were manufactured using the same method, those referred to as "printed" bore stamps listing numbers and letters. In 1767, the Spanish Crown approved subsequent issues, conditioning that they should be collected once situado shipped. When this was lacking, paper money was used in a widespread manner throughout the main island. These requirements were met when possible, an example of this was in 1769, when 88,000 banknotes were reclaimed by the authorities.

However, a new issue of 4-pesos, 1-peso, 2-reales and 1-real bills followed and by November 1770 at least 88,014 were in circulation. The involvement of Spain in the American Revolutionary War caused the printing of more bills between 1779 and 1780. In 1783, notes (valued 1, 2 and 4 reales, 1 and 4 pesos) valued at 664,325 were produced, which was followed by another printing of 2-reales and 4-peso notes to reach at least 695,500 pesos. When the situado arrived, 400,000 pesos were used to withdraw the notes from circulation. In 1787 another issue was allowed. On February 9, 1797, yet another issue was ordered.

== Birth of the Puerto Rican peso ==
Puerto Rican peso
Peso Puertorriqueño (Spanish)
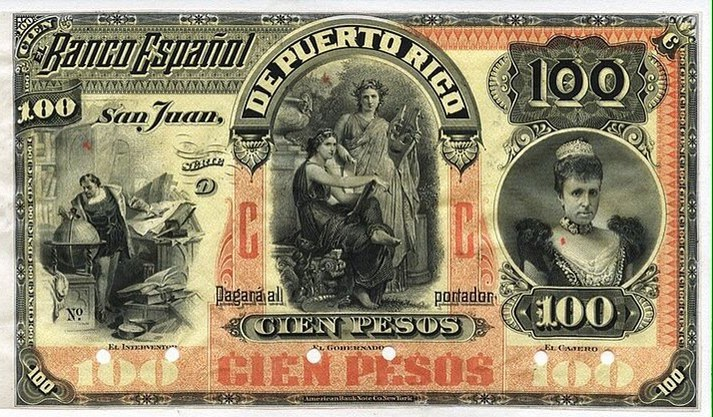
100 pesos 1894 (Obverse)
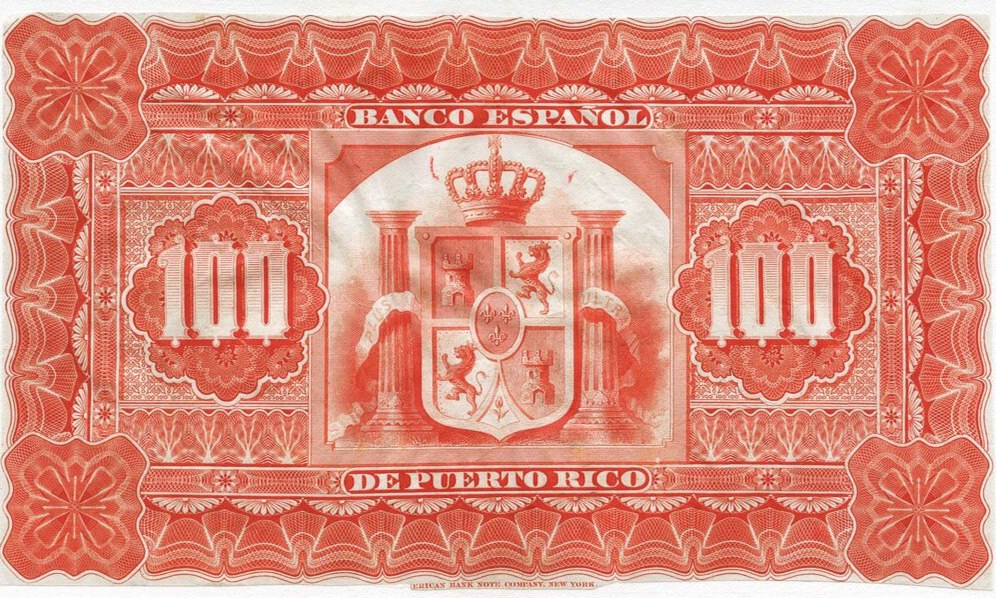
100 pesos (Reverse)

Unit
- Plural: pesos

Denominations
- Subunit
- 1/100: centavo
- Banknotes: 1, 3, 5, 10, 20, 50, 100, 200 ps
- Coins: 5, 10, 20, 40 centavos, 1 peso

Demographics
- Date of introduction: 31 August 1812
- User(s): (Spain) Captaincy General of Puerto Rico

Issuance
- Central bank: El Banco Español de Puerto Rico List: La Real Tesorería de Puerto Rico (1815); Tesorería Nacional de Puerto Rico (1813)
- Printer: American Bank Note Co. New York
- Website: www.abnote.com
- Mint: Fábrica Nacional de Moneda y Timbre, Madrid, Spain
- Website: www.fnmt.es/en

In the 19th century, the issuing of situado concluded, with two last deliveries of 500,000 and 100,000 between 1809 and 1810. This brought forth a critical economical crisis to Puerto Rico. Besides aiding the fleeing Spanish refugees, the local government was also forced to payroll military interventions in Santo Domingo and Venezuela, aggravating the issue. At the moment, Salvador Meléndez Bruna, the colonial governor in office, ordered the production of provincial paper money. The decree was officially enacted on August 31, 1812. This was done at behest of treasurer Juan Patiño, who faced opposition by a group of functionaries and merchantmen that lobbied to reduce the amount of existing coins. The intent was to cover the budget for some months. These banknotes used the designation of peso as equivalent to Spanish reales.

Produced by hand, these banknotes featured quantities in the thousands, with 1 peso being worth 8 reales. The initial run reached 80,000 pesos (in denominations of 1 and 2 reales and 4 pesos). In practice these bills were valued at half a real, 1 real, 2 reales, 8 reales and 4 pesos. Those ranging from 4 reales to 4 pesos, featured the Coat of arms of Castile and León with quantity being written manually with seals and a specific registry number certifying its authenticity. These codes were recorded and locked away in a chest requiring three keys to open, in an attempt to prevent fraud. The bills worth 1 and 2 reales featured a seal, but less safety measures were taken with them.

Mechanical printing had arrived to Puerto Rico years earlier, but up until 1813, part of the issued notes were being produced by hand and stamped. Between 1812 and 1813, the tradition of collecting paper money continued, which reduced the amount of surviving banknotes drastically. The other notes printed between 1813 and 1814, featured a combination of printed types and stamps. The printing was done by Puerto Rico's National Printing Office and featured patterns to prevent the production of counterfeits. Those featuring denominations in reales, were adorned by Spain's Royal Seal, with the color varying depending on the date of issue and the 1813 8-real banknotes featured a lamb on the obverse. However, these security measures were ineffective against counterfeiting, eventually copies of several denominations were circulating in a widespread manner, forcing cities outside of San Juan, Arecibo and Loíza to discontinue their use. Meléndez Bruna decided that the only way to prevent forgery was by asking Spain to produce sealed paper for the printing of the banknotes. The first issue bore the signatures of treasurers or accountants, but this was dropped the subsequent year.

On November 20, 1812, another emission of 85,000 pesos was produced. However, during this time depreciation reached 12.5%. The third began on January 28, 1813, and was worth 85,000 pesos. This was affected by a depreciation of 30-50%. Before this one was done, two more began, one worth 50,000 pesos and another 25,000 pesos. These were, however, affected by the preceding rate of devaluation and reached 80% depreciation, a rate that would extend for the following months. The sixth overlapped with the later phase of the previous two, beginning on June 15, 1813, and being worth some 40,000 pesos. The week after this was done, the seventh was printed for 50,000 pesos.

Expectations that money was incoming lowered depreciation to 50%, rebounding it to 100% when these coins failed to arrive. The final printing began on August 25, 1813, for 85,000 pesos. In the end, 208,000 pesos were printed on 4-peso notes, 233,500 on 8-reales notes, 28,000 on 4-reales notes, 20,502 on 2-reales notes, 7,998 on 1-real notes and 2,000 pesos on half a real notes. By 1814, notes had depreciated to 300%. Pedro Tomás de Córdova claims that the following year, this had duplicated to 600%. The cost of merchandise was exorbitant, leading to arrangements to separate the offices of governor and intendent being accomplished by Ramón Power y Giralt.

=== End of the Cádiz Constitution ===
On February 11, 1813, Alejandro Ramírez arrived to Puerto Rico and almost immediately was named to the office of Intendant, eventually establishing a Consulate of Commerce to control trade in Puerto Rico. Originally from Guatemala, where he had served in various political positions, Ramírez was also a member of the Philadelphia Philosophical Society. The Diario Económico de Puerto Rico, a newspaper specialized in the archipelago's economy, noted that during the time banknotes of all denominations were still being forged in large quantities. The publication claimed that the counterfeits were most likely produced in other locations of the Caribbean, this was based on the fact that only one royal press existed in Puerto Rico. However, modern researchers maintain that the copies could have been produced locally in a clandestine manner. This is based on a report that emphasizes that the designs of false 8-real notes were crude and that the ink used spread when touched, something that would not be possible if produced elsewhere, particularly because the ink would dry in the voyage between countries. A 46-page guide for the use of paper money was published. Notes were restored, both as protocol and to counter the appearance of counterfeit notes, reportedly originating from Saint Thomas. Other measures were taken, in particular against foreigners and "suspicious people", and the Díario Económico de Puerto Rico informed about the features of some of the fake bills. Any banknote that failed certification was considered false. With the copper factionary coin disappearing, Ramírez imposed a number of measures intending to remove the bills as soon as possible. One of these was to allow the circulation of the macuquina that was being brought by those arriving from Venezuela, where that coin was minted by Spain, which received approval of the governor.

In 1814, Ferdinand VII refused to renew the Spanish Constitution of 1812, returning the Empire to an absolutist method of government. Consequently, Ramírez contacted some of his allies in Philadelphia and commissioned the production of banknotes in denominations of 3 and 5 reales. The issues were printed by Murray, Draper, Fairman & Company and featured the signatures of treasurer José Bacener and Ramírez. The designs featured the Spanish Crown and Ferdinand VII's profile in the two varieties and were numbered manually. Intendent Alejandro Ramírez de Estenos, who also signed the new pieces. No official documentation, letter or decree from the Spanish Crown related to the creation of these notes have surfaced. These issues were collected and destroyed with extreme efficacy in 1866, leaving only a few dozen intact.

On August 3, 1814, governor Salvador Meléndez established a plan to remove the banknotes from circulation by eliminating 100,000 per year for ta period of five years. Discounts and depreciation were controlled. Merchants and civilians were forced to accept the bills, or were fined, stripped of belongings or exiled. These measures were protested by the merchants and lead to a decrease in funds entering the Treasury and other actions being taken to circumvent them. Eventually, Meléndez suspended them on October 25, 1814. The Junta de Directores de la Amortización was created to pay the quantities owed in banknotes, which were then burned publicly. On November 23, 1814, the Caja de Amortización was created. The Royal Decree of Graces of 1815 allowed wider access to foreigners for settlement, which resulted in more coins being brought to Puerto Rico. Free mercantile traffic between Spain and its allies was also beneficial. By the summer of 1816, 481,567 pesos, with 1 real and 11 maravedís denominations (out of the 500,000) had been amortized, with the remainder being regarded as nominal losses.

Real Tesorería de Puerto Rico
Obverse	Value	Obverse description	Issued	Withdrawn
	3 pesos	Coat of arms of Spain	1815	
	5 pesos	King Ferdinand VII	1819	
Engraved and printed by: Murray, Draper, Fairman and Co.

== Reemergence of paper money ==
The negative perception created by the issue of paper money between 1813 and 1815, brought the production of banknotes to a halt, while only coins circulated in the archipelago. In 1836, James Macqueen made arrangements to establish a branch of the Colonial Bank of London in Puerto Rico, accomplishing this in 1837-38 despite facing opposition. The bank issued banknotes, but these were quickly gathered following a decision by the Junta de Comercio y Fomento on January 29, 1838.

In 1865, the Spanish Civil Code was imposed in Puerto Rico. Meanwhile, the Caja de Ahorros was founded in San Juan, a small bank, which provided an annual interest of up to 6% to its subscribers. The institution was bankrupted in 1879, but its business model was followed by other banks founded in the southern region of Puerto Rico. The Caja de Ahorros de Ponce (lit. "Ponce Savings Bank") was founded in 1873 and continued in business until 1879. The institution issued notes in denominations of 1, 3, 5 and 50 pesos which were printed by the P.W. Derhan firm. These bills were only printed in one side and were signed by members of the bank's board of directors, which was composed by eminent Puerto Rican citizens. These were redeemed mostly in Ponce and co-existed along tokens issued by local business entities. The bill colors varied by denomination, being green (1 peso), blue with green ink (3 and 5 pesos) and red and brown (50 pesos). which earned interest and served as coupons and were used as money in the municipality of Ponce. On July 19, 1875, the creation of banknotes was authorized to compensate former slave owners following the abolition of slavery. These were used as legal tender and earned a 6% interest per semester. These were systematically redeemed, until 70,000 had been amortized in 1890.

In 1868, the Central Republican Board of Cuba and Puerto Rico (CRBCPR) was founded. The group organized expeditions to Cuba, offering supplies to movements that supported the independence of Puerto Rico and Cuba. Founded by José Francisco Basora, a Puerto Rican revolutionary and friend of Ramón Emeterio Betances, the group had connections within the wealthy sugar industry in the larger Antille. Bonds for quantities of 100, 500 and 1,000 pesos were printed between June 1 and November 1, 1869, in order to cover the expenses of the two planned revolutions. On August 17, 1869, the board issued notes in denominations of 1, 5, 10 and 20 pesos, these were produced to establish an affordable alternative to the bonds. All of these issues circulated throughout North and South America as well as the Caribbean. Although they were widespread in the Spanish processions, their use was kept clandestine to avoid imprisonment by the royal authorities. These notes were classified by color for denomination, being beige (1 peso), blue (5 pesos), green (10 pesos) and red (20 pesos). However, none of them was redeemed due to the failure of the Ten Years' War and Little War in Cuba.

On December 17, 1866, Maria Christina of Austria signed a Royal Decree which authorized the auctioning of a railroad in Puerto Rico. In 1888, Ivo Bosch y Puig, an engineer from Catalonia, received the concession to put the project in march. In Madrid, Bosch y Puig established the Compañía de los Ferrocarriles de Puerto Rico (lit. "Puerto Rico Railroad Company"). During this decade, Charles Skipper and East produced beige and blue 5-peso banknotes in England, which were circulated after receiving the signatures of Bosch y Puig and an unidentified associate. They were in use between 1880-1890, it is now assumed that these were used to pay employees.

=== The provincial coin ===
Denomination	Image	Obverse	Quantity	Comp	Edge	Issued	Mint
5 centavos		Date, value	600,000	Silver (.835)	Reeded	1896	Spanish; Royal; Mint
10 centavos		Alfonso XIII of Spain	700,000	Silver (.835)	Reeded	1896	Spanish; Royal; Mint
20 centavos		Alfonso XIII of Spain	3,350,000	Silver (.835)	Reeded	1895	Spanish; Royal; Mint
40 centavos		Alfonso XIII of Spain	725,000	Silver (.835)	Reeded	1896	Spanish; Royal; Mint
1 Peso		Alfonso XIII of Spain	8,500,000	Silver (.900)	27 Fleur-de-lis	1895	Spanish; Royal; Mint
^1Source: Engraver: B.M. Bartolomé Maura y Montaner.							Spanish; Royal; Mint

Due to its strategic location, currencies from several countries began circulating in Puerto Rico and used as trade. The government often ordered the collection of these coins in exchange for exchange notes. The first of these took place in 1857, when a royal decree ordered the gathering of coins (macuquina). Due to Spanish manufacture, the exchange notes issued for the macuquina featured a 12.5% discount, which left a significant deficit in the government's budget. A decade later, coins were brought from the Dominican Republic to Puerto Rico. Consequently, the distribution of foreign coins received authorization. In 1879, the circulation of Mexican silver was approved in government and official entities, eventually allowing public distribution in 1881. However, some saw an opportunity for profit in this and bought Mexican pesos outside of Puerto Rico before importing them, in the process gaining a profit of up to 40 centavos per peso. In 1884, a number of different coins were countermarked with a fleur-de-lis for circulation on Puerto Rico. Spanish 2, 4 and 8 reales, and 5 and 10 céntimos, United States' 20 cents, quarters, halves and dollars were all countermarked and used until they were redeemed in 1894. By 1895, the coins circulating in Puerto Rico were mostly Mexican silver, creating a shortage of currency. To resolve this, Spain issued a Royal Decree stating that the Mexican coins were to be replaced by ones minted in Madrid, with special coins created exclusively for Puerto Rico. The Ministerio de Ultramar produced a series of 5,000,000 Exchange Notes valued 1-peso, which were colored yellow and brown on the front and green on the back with an image of an unidentified conquistador. This pursuant to a Royal Decree dated August 17, 1895, which created a special coin to be used while the Mexican coins were compiled prior to the implementation of the provincial currency. Once the exchange concluded in 1896, the provincial coin was already in circulation. Silver 20 centavos and 1 peso coins were introduced in 1895, followed in 1896 by silver 5, 10 and 40 centavos. The 1 peso coins bore the denomination as "1 PESO = 5 P.TAS". These exchanges heavily affected the government's economy. Some years later, a commercial firm in San Juan named Ceredo Millán obtained some of the now-obsolete Exchange Notes, which were converted into souvenirs and offered as gifts to their clients.

== Banco Español de Puerto Rico ==
On May 23, 1887, Maria Christina of Austria and Victor Balaguer, Spain's Overseas Minister, signed a Royal Decree proposing the creation of a Royal Bank in Puerto Rico. A waiting period of three months was imposed to those interested in pursuing the project, who had to present a business proposal as dictated by the order. Two proposals were formally presented and taken under consideration. One of these, was presented by the Sociedad Anónima de Crédito Mercantil de Puerto Rico (lit. "Puerto Rico Mercantile Credit Company"; SACMPR), which was represented by Manuel Vicente Rodríguez, Enrique Vijande, Guillermo Mullenhoff, Pablo Ubarri Capetillo and José Caldas, with all of them serving as the group's directors. The other one was presented by a coalition of French and Spanish bankers. The proposal which bore the signature of Francisco Lastres and Eulogio Despujols, who acted as their representatives, was ultimately accepted.

On May 5, 1888, a second royal decree was issue, officializing the creation of the Banco Español de Puerto Rico, which received a charter validity of 25 years. This grant of authority was awarded to Enrique Vijande y Loredo, José Caldas y Caldas and Pablo Ubarri, a group of San Juan merchants and directors of the SACMPR. The bank was not established immediately, this was because the currency being used in Puerto Rico was Mexican silver, which created problems and delayed the establishment date until early 1890. Until this point, the SACMPR continued in service, before disappearing in April.

El Banco Español de Puerto Rico notes
Image		Value	Description		Date
Front	Reverse	Value	Front	Reverse	Issued
Series A
		5 pesos	Paschal Lamb, seated child	Crowned; Spanish arms	1890
		10 pesos	Paschal Lamb, sailors	Crowned; Spanish arms	1889/1890
		20 pesos	Paschal Lamb, longshoremen	Crowned; Spanish arms	1889/1890
		50 pesos	Paschal Lamb, Columbus sighting land	Crowned; Spanish arms	1889/1890
		100 pesos	Christopher Columbus, allegorical women, Paschal Lamb	Crowned; Spanish arms	1890
		200 pesos	"Lady Justice" (Justicia), allegorical woman, Paschal Lamb	Crowned; Spanish arms	1890
Series B (never circulated)
Series D
		5 pesos	Queen Regent Maria Cristina, seated child	Crowned; Spanish arms	1 December 1894; 2 March 1896; 3 November 1896; 1 July 1897
		10 pesos	Queen Regent Maria Cristina, sailors	Crowned; Spanish arms	1 December 1894; 2 March 1896; 3 November 1896; 1 July 1897
		20 pesos	Queen Regent Maria Cristina, dock workers	Crowned; Spanish arms	1 December 1894; 2 March 1896; 3 November 1896; 1 July 1897
		50 pesos	Queen Regent Maria Cristina, Christopher Columbus sighting land	Crowned; Spanish arms	1 December 1894; 2 March 1896; 3 November 1896; 1 July 1897
		100 pesos	Christopher Columbus, allegorical women, Queen Regent Maria Cristina	Crowned; Spanish arms	1 December 1894; 2 March 1896; 3 November 1896; 1 July 1897
		200 pesos	"Lady Justice", allegorical woman, Queen Regent Maria Cristina	Crowned; Spanish arms	1895-97
Series C / Provisional issue / United States Administration^{1}

Note: Printed by: American Bank Note Company. New York. Series C (did not circulate under Spanish control) bills were issued with a release date of "May 1, 1900", some were over stamped with "Moneda Americana" (American money) in bold red letters.

During this timeframe, they produced 100-peso banknotes featuring the lamb, Puerto Rico's official emblem. The bank was inaugurated on February 1, 1890, with Juan Róspide y Navarro and José Manuel López Sainz as governor and vice governor respectively. The Royal Decree permitted the issuing of paper money in denominations of 5, 10, 20, 50, 100 and 200 pesos. These banknotes were manufactured by the American Bank Note Company. The original bank was located in San Juan, with a second one being established in Mayagüez in 1894. Until 1898, the institution issued four series A, B, C and D, though apparently C was put into production after D and did not circulate under Spanish control. After the Caja Subalterna was established in the municipality of Mayagüez, some bills were stamped with the word "MAYAGÜEZ". The circulation went from 145,000 pesos to 2,250,000 in 1897. Metal coins were scarce, and the exclusivity of the currency made it popular among the public. Series D began distribution on December 1, 1894; this became the first time that the lamb, which had continued being used since the days of the Sociedad Anónima de Crédito Mercantil de Puerto Rico, was replaced by the profile of Maria Christina of Austria. A total of 2,581,285 worth of banknotes with this design were printed. The Ministerio de Ultramar issued 1 peso notes in 1895.

=== American invasion and decline ===
Puerto Rican dollar
Dólar Puertoriqueño (Spanish)
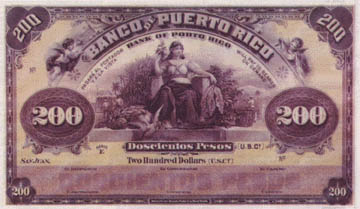
- Bilingual 200 pesos banknote (series E)

Denominations
- Subunit
- 1/100: centavo
- Banknotes: 5, 10, 20, 50, 100, 200 dollars series E (1904), series F (1909)
- Coins: 5, 10, 20, 40 centavos

Demographics
- User(s): Puerto Rico (U.S.)

Issuance
- Central bank: Bank of Porto Rico (1898–1913)
- Printer: American Bank Note Co. N.Y.
- Website: www.abnote.com

Valuation
- Pegged with: United States dollar

On August 13, 1898, Spain ceded Puerto Rico to the United States as part of the Treaty of Paris, bringing the Puerto Rican Campaign to an end. The Banco Español de Puerto Rico was then transferred to invading investors. However, the terms signed in the armistice, stated that the United States would have to respect all the charters that were previously granted by Spain to its former colonies. This was certified by the United States Congress on June 6, 1900 via in resolution 247-H and president Mickinley signed. Thus, the bank continued issuing provincial currency in Puerto Rico, but was renamed El Banco de Puerto Rico or Bank of Puerto Rico. The capital used by the currency was changed from peso to dollars, giving birth to the Puerto Rican dollar. A proposal to print 1-dollar banknotes was suggested, but refused citing that it could "bring dangerous results". Series C bills were issued with a release date of "May 1, 1900" and were overstamped with "Moneda Americana" in bold red letters. They bore the signatures of the new bank governor Carlos María Soler and cashier Manuel Vicente. This marked the first and only time that currency valorized in dollars was issued outside the United States. The total value of this issue of $921,000.

Series E was introduced in 1904 for the total sum of $620,000. The banknotes for this issue were bilingual, featuring the bank's name both in Spanish and English and featuring the goddess Moneta on the front and the lamb on the back. Early specimens for Series F were produced in 1907, but they never reached circulation. The bills for this issue featured the profiles of Christopher Columbus and Juan Ponce de León. The colonial government intended to eliminate all Spanish captions from these notes, intending to accelerate a failed "Americanization" process in Puerto Rico. Series F ultimately entered circulation on July 1, 1909, still featuring bilingual captions and exhibiting a higher degree of technical quality. This issue was worth $465,000. The colonial administration also devaluated the coin in 60%, favoring the United States dollar, which hit the bank severely and culminated with its asset being reduced to only 375,000 dollars.

In 1913, the charter granted by Spain expired and the bank was closed and its assets were liquidated. After this date, Puerto Rico's economy was fully integrated into the United States' currency system, while Puerto Rican dollars were redeemed for United States dollars. Banknotes valorized in millions continued in circulation, thus a collect was ordered and held between January 16 – 24, 1916. The process was overseen by a colonial Liquidation Commission and by 1924 only 14,872 were still circulated. Entering 1925, the only series with more than a thousand exemplars left was F, which still remains the more common. Higher denominations, are either rare or extremely rare. The remaining bills were taken out of circulation by the Puerto Rico Commercial Bank.

Bank of Porto Rico
Front	Reverse	Value	Portrait	Reverse	Issued
Series F
		$5	Christopher Columbus	Allegorical woman	1 July 1909
		$10	Juan Ponce de León	Liberty	1 July 1909

Parallel to the Bank of Puerto Rico, American investors saw an opportunity to establish banks in Puerto Rico. The first of these was the American Colonial Bank, which opened in 1899. The establishment of national banks was proposed to the Office of the Comptroller of the Currency, with charters being eventually established in June 1900. The requirements for establishing a bank under this grant of authority, demanded that at least three-fourths of the board of directors lived in Puerto Rico at least for a year. It took the group two years to meet these regulations, but in 1902 the First National Bank of Porto Rico was inaugurated, with Andrés Crosas from San Juan serving as its president. The bank began issuing notes in denominations of 10 (featuring McKinley on the front and Columbia in the back), 20 (featuring Hugh McCulloch on the front and Columbia in the back), 50 (featuring John Sherman and a woman representing work and science in the reverse) and 100 dollars which were manufactured by October 27, 1902, even before all of the requirements were met. These were in production until the bank closed in 1911. In 1933, the enactment of the Puerto Rican Emergency a Relief Administration lead to a series of 1,812,012 banknotes issued in $1 denominations being sent to local banks for circulation.

== Collection value and numismatic study ==
The remaining exemplars of Puerto Rican currency have gathered significant value with the years, particularly in the United States. The value of them within the collectors of that country is due to the special nature of the post-1898 issues. Since they were issued under the same Spanish provincial charter, the Bureau of Engraving and Printing classifies them as "territorial" currency, this being the only unit of exchange of this kind that is recognized by the United States Department of the Treasury. The collector value of Puerto Rican banknotes begins at around 5,000 for the more common varieties, with the more rare ones not possessing a specific price range. In the case of specimen bills, these are valued differently.

Objects from Puerto Rico are constantly featured in specialized magazines, in both national and international distribution. In 2006, a limited release of Catálogo del paper moneda de Puerto Rico was issued, the first to deal exclusively with banknotes, with subsequent editions being published in more quantity. Westernbank published a book detailing the collection of Humberto Costas.

The Puerto Rican dollars that were collected by the government, were burned between January 16–24, 1925, drastically reducing the amount of surviving notes from the Bank of Puerto Rico. The Great Depression reduced their numbers further, since necessity prevented the collection of pesos in large denominations. Thus less than five exemplars are known to exist of the 100 and 200 peso banknotes issued by El Banco Español de Puerto Rico and the 5 and 10 dollars Series F bills published by the Bank of Puerto Rico. This scarcity makes them a hard find, even for wealthy collectors.

Similarly, the other notes issued by this banks range from scarce to rare. The banknotes from the First National Bank of Porto Rico are particularly scarce, this is because the institution's issues did not even reach quantities of 20. Only two bills from the $100 denomination have been known to survive, similarly two from the $20 issue are left, with one of them being acquired by Amon G. Carter before his death. Carter was known to exhibit the piece, but did not make it available for sale. More than a dozen $10 banknotes survived, seldom appearing at auctions. Other extremely rare banknotes include the 2 and 4 real notes of 1813 and all of the denominations issued by the Caja de Ahorros de Ponce. In contrast, the paper money used by the Puerto Rico Railroad Company is still known to appear occasionally in the market. Outside of these, the clandestine bills issued by the Central Republican Board of Cuba and Puerto Rico, range from scarce (5-peso bill) to extremely rare (20-peso notes).

In Puerto Rico, the Sociedad Numismática de Puerto Rico (lit. "Numismatic Society of Puerto Rico") was founded in 1949. The society is usually composed of 25 to 50 members and it focuses in collecting and distributing both coins and banknotes from Puerto Rico to interested collectors. An annual exhibition along the Sociedad Filatelica de Puerto Rico (lit. "Philatelic Society of Puerto Rico") has been held in Plaza Las Américas since the commercial center's inauguration. The SNPR also published a magazine named Numiexpo. Outside of this activity, Puerto Rican currency can be found locally in philatelic and numismatic as well as flea markets. At auctions, banknotes have been known to surpass bid that are up to 70,000 dollars. The collection of cardboard samples given by banks to numismatic merchants, has also been noted among enthusiasts.

== Other issued currency ==
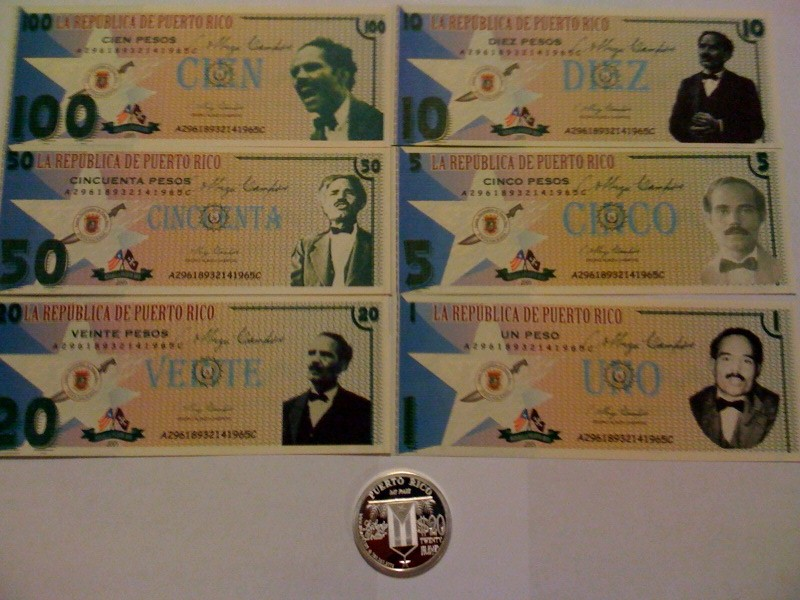
A variety of contemporary issues. Ranging from 2005 to 2007.

Between 1813 and 1815, the government of Puerto Rico created vouchers with which they paid merchants, and which were valid and could be redeemed as contribution money in the custom houses and redeemed in the Royal Treasury when funds were available. In 2005, the Puerto Rican Nationalist Party issued a limited amount of banknotes commemorating the Jayuya Uprising. The series included pesos of six denominations, including $1, $5, $10, $20, $50 and $100 bills. The designs of all banknotes feature Pedro Albizu Campos in the front side while the reverses are adorned with the flags of Puerto Rico, Jayuya and the Nationalist Party. Microprint with the names of Pedro Albizu Campos and Filiberto Ojeda Ríos are found throughout the pesos. On July 10, 2005, Liberty Dollar of Puerto Rico was created by Alfredo Pacheco Martínez. Silver ounces began circulating on October 8, 2005, marking the first time that a silver coin was distributed in more than a century. After an intervention with parent company Liberty Services concluded with its assets being confiscated, leading to a process that resulted in the indictment and conviction of founder Bernard von NotHaus, Pacheco Martínez continued to circulate the coins under the name of Dólar Boricua. In August 2010, he was also indicted on the same charges faced by Von NotHaus. Pacheco Martínez was found guilty on June 29, 2012, being subsequently sentenced to 19 years in prison.

In December 2007, the United States Congress approved a measure that included the Commonwealth of Puerto Rico, Washington, D.C., and several non-autonomous territories including American Samoa, Guam and the United States Virgin Islands in the 50 State Quarters program. Both commonwealths and territories were excluded from the original program approved in 1998, which was followed by almost ten years of lobbying before they were included. The design on these coins was expected to feature the same George Washington image found in the obverse of the original issues, while the reverse would depict illustrations of something characteristic to that location. The Secretary of Treasury approved the design on July 31, 2008. The coins were issued, as well as "proof coins" and 90% silver special issues. The Puerto Rico coin was the second release in 2009. In 2012, as part of the National Park Quarters Program initiative, the United States Mint was due to release a quarter commemorating the inclusion of El Yunque National Forest as part of the National Forest System in 1903.

== See also ==
- Cuban peso
- Spanish dollar
- Spanish peseta
- Central banks and currencies of the Caribbean
- Currencies of the British West Indies
