= Vera Valor =

Gold currency

- France
- Mass: (1 troy oz)
- Edge: Reeded
- Composition: 99.99% fine gold (Au)
- Gold: 1 troy oz
- Years of minting: 2011–

Obverse
- Design: "1 gold ounce" written in English, French, Spanish, Arabic and Chinese

Reverse
- Design: a QR code

The Vera Valor is a dual digital and physical gold currency of one troy ounce with no face value other than that of one ounce of "four nine" purity fine gold. The reverse side of the coin is particular by its embedded QR code which allows for digital liquidity.

== History ==
The coin was privately developed in France and released in late 2011. Since the Monnaie de Paris (Paris Mint) owns the state monopoly over the minting of coins endowed with a face value, the coin was designed to have no other face value than that of a troy ounce of fine gold, yet with a unique serial number to facilitate its use as a digital currency. Its obverse value indicates "Vera Valor" and 1 "ounce" written in English, French, Spanish, Arabic and Chinese while its reverse side displays a QR code which is unique for each coin. It is minted in Switzerland and comparable to the Chinese Gold Panda

== See also ==
- E-gold
- Liberty Dollar
- Wocu
- World currency
