= Michael DeNoma =

American banker and businessman

Michael Bernard DeNoma
- Education: Bachelor of Arts Degree at Ohio University; MBA in Finance at Wharton School of Business at the University of Pennsylvania
- Occupations: Director and board member of the International Centre for Missing & Exploited Children

Michael (‘Mike’) Bernard DeNoma is an American banker and businessman. He is a director and board member of the International Centre for Missing & Exploited Children, where he has held the position for seventeen years. DeNoma was previously at KBZ Bank, Myanmar’s largest private bank. where he served as the bank’s CEO from 2017 to 2020. DeNoma’s career has seen him participate as Executive Board member at some of the most successful banks and brands in Asia. Examples include chairman and board member of Chinatrust Commercial Bank and board member of Standard Chartered.

== Education and early business career ==
DeNoma graduated with a BA from the Honors Tutorial College at Ohio University in 1977. He earned an MBA in finance from the Wharton School of Business at the University of Pennsylvania in 1981.

DeNoma began his career with Procter & Gamble in 1982 as a brand manager based in Cincinnati, Ohio. He moved to PepsiCo Inc. in 1985, where he served as an international director of marketing, overseeing operations in 65 countries across Southern Europe and Africa. He was later promoted to vice president and general manager in the PepsiCo Restaurant Group. In 1989 DeNoma relocated to Singapore as senior vice president for Citigroup, with responsibility for marketing and consumer banking across Asia and the Middle East. He was appointed Chief Operating Officer of Hutchison Whampoa in 1991, increasing growth over the company’s core sectors in retail, media and consumer packaged goods. In 1993 DeNoma established Asia Foods Limited, expanding the business across China while serving as the company’s chief executive and board chairman until its sale in 1999.

== Career in financial services, food and hospitality ==
DeNoma has held executive positions at multinational businesses based in London, Hong Kong, and Singapore. In 1993 DeNoma established high-tech nation-wide food company Asia Foods Limited, expanding the business across China while serving as the company’s chief executive and board chairman until its sale in 1999.

DeNoma subsequently joined Standard Chartered Bank in 1999, and was appointed CEO of its Global Consumer Bank in 2000, a position he held until 2009. As CEO, DeNoma grew revenues by $4 billion over the course of seven years, and increased the company’s customer base from 5 million to 14 million. He was appointed to the Standard Chartered Plc board of directors in 2000.

Between 2009 and 2012 DeNoma was the Chairman and CEO of CTBC Financial Holdings (formerly Chinatrust Commercial Bank) in Taiwan. He led the turnaround of the family-owned bank after being recruited by Morgan Stanley Private Equity, increasing profits to company record levels of $570 million in 2011.

From 2012 to 2016 DeNoma was CEO of GLH Hotels, the largest hotel owner-operator in London, as well as GuocoLeisure, the Singapore-listed investment company with investments in leisure, gaming, oil and gas, and property development. Under DeNoma’s leadership, the Guoman and Thistle brands were rebranded and incorporated into GLH Hotels, comprising the hotel brands Clermont, Amba, and Every.

In 2017, DeNoma returned to the financial sector when he was appointed as Advisor to the Chairman, and CEO of KBZ Bank in Myanmar, where he led the development of KBZPay, Myanmar's fastest growing mobile wallet and financial inclusion product. KBZPay onboarded over 230,000 merchants and agents and more than 22 million fully KYC-ed customers since launch. He also stewarded the transformation of the bank, focusing on digital innovation, financial inclusion, and international standards of governance.

== Philanthropy ==
DeNoma has been serving as a member of the board of directors for the International Centre for Missing & Exploited Children. for seventeen years.

DeNoma spearheaded the establishment of the Washington D.C.–based Financial Coalition Against Child Pornography (FCACP) in his role as Group Executive Director, Standard Chartered Bank, and a Board Member of ICMEC. Under his leadership, Standard Chartered became a founding member of the FCACP. In this capacity, participated in a panel at the House of Senate in September 2006 to discuss Standard Chartered’s approach to combating the issue through the banking payment system.

In 2007, he also led a joint action against child pornography with the Association of Banks in Singapore and called UK bankers to join forces for the same cause.

From the age of 50, DeNoma participated in several ultramarathons to raise money for children's charities worldwide. As an individual and through his charity, the Impossible Odds Foundation, DeNoma has completed nearly 2,000 miles (3,219 km) in races and raised over $1 million over the course of 15 years. Specifically, in 2011, DeNoma ran a 400 km ultra-marathon from Kaohsiung to Taipei as part of China’s Silk Road Run to raise awareness for ICMEC.

During his tenure as the CEO of KBZ Bank, DeNoma introduced an initiative to provide medicine and treatment to children. In 2017, KBZ Bank worked with Myanmar’s Ministry of Health and Sports and Singapore-based charity Smile Asia to help children with cleft lips and palates. Over three years, the program helped 675 children across Myanmar by providing them with free operations.

== Advisory roles ==
DeNoma has previously served as Senior Advisor at KKR & Co. L.P, the American multinational private equity firm. He was also a member of the Advisory Board at McKinsey & Company, the worldwide management consulting firm, as well as a member of the board of Trustees for Singapore Management University.

== Recognition ==
DeNoma was awarded Global Retail Banker of the Year in 2008 and Best Retail Banker 2007 by the Asian Banker.
