= Gold gram =

Value represented by one gram of gold

A gold gram is the amount of value represented by exactly one gram of gold. It is a unit of account frequently used for digital gold currencies. It is sometimes denoted by the symbol "gg", "AUG", or "GAU".

A milligram of gold is sometimes referred to as a mil or mgg. Therefore, 1 AUG = 1 gg = 1000 mgg = 1000 mil, and 1 mil = 1 mgg = 0.001 gg = 0.001 AUG. This allows gold holdings and transfers to take place in tiny fractions of a gram (equivalent to a few cents).

A possible source of confusion is that gold is often priced on the open market in the more traditional troy ounce (one troy ounce is exactly 31.1034768 grams, which is larger than the avoirdupois ounce generally in use in the United States and has a mass of 28.35 grams). Kilogram gold prices are commonly used by the Zurich Gold Pool where 1,000 kilograms = one tonne.
