= 1mdc =

Digital gold currency

1mdc was a digital gold currency (DGC) that existed from 2001 to 2007 in which users traded digital currency backed by reserves of e-gold, rather than physical bullion reserves.

The website appeared to switch between various offshore hosting locations, and used software designed by Interesting Software Ltd, an Anguilla company.

As of April 27, 2007, a US court order has forced e-gold to liquidate a large number of e-gold accounts totalling some 10 to 20 million US dollars' worth of gold. A small part of this seizure was 1mdc's accounts and assets . If the court order in the USA is reversed, a user's e-gold grams remaining in 1mdc will "unbail" normally to the user's e-gold account. Ultimately e-gold is owned and operated by US citizens, so, 1mdc users must respect the decisions of US courts and the US authorities regarding the disposition of e-gold and the safety and security of US citizens. Even though 1mdc has no connection whatsoever to the US, and most 1mdc users are non-USA, ultimately e-gold is operated from the USA.

== Features ==
As with any digital gold currency, one used 1mdc to keep assets away from fiat currencies and avoid inflationary risks associated with them. To open an account, 1mdc required the user to have a functioning e-mail address, an e-gold account, a password, initials and a PIN.

1mdc charged 0.05 gold grams per spend for accounts that receive 100 or more spends (total over 500 grams) to their account in any given calendar month. There were no spend fees for accounts that receive 99 or less spends in a calendar month, and no storage fees on all accounts. This was in sharp contrast to e-gold, which charges a storage fee of 1% per annum. Coupled with the quick and easy transfer of funds between e-gold and 1mdc accounts, 1mdc was attractive to persons with large amounts of e-gold, whose balances gradually shrink due to e-gold's storage fees. 1mdc also offered virtually fee free exchange from Pecunix gold to 1mdc, and a 5% fee to exchange from 1mdc to Pecunix gold. It was often said that most or all heavy users of e-gold are 1mdc users, although of course there was no way of confirming this.

== Criticisms ==
1mdc's e-gold was held in unallocated (pooled) storage (in several e-gold user accounts) which allowed for extra privacy from e-gold's administrators. However, this increased storage risk, as the client had no precedence on the e-gold they entrusted 1mdc to hold, and there was virtually no way for a user to ensure that 1mdc is maintaining full reserves of their e-gold. The amount of e-gold held in the 1mdc system was undisclosed.

Also, since 1mdc was backed by e-gold, events that affect e-gold also affected 1mdc. Once e-gold Ltd. was instructed by the US government to freeze and liquidate all 1mdc accounts, 1mdc became insolvent by default along with all other e-gold accounts seized in the April 27 action.
