= ECache =

Digital gold currency provider

eCache was a digital gold currency (DGC) provider which operated over the Tor network from 2007 to 2014.

eCache was completely anonymous just like physical cash. The eCache mint which issued the certificates didn't store any transaction details or personally identifiable information that was requested from the mint or any other user.
