= Gold to Go =

ATM of Gold

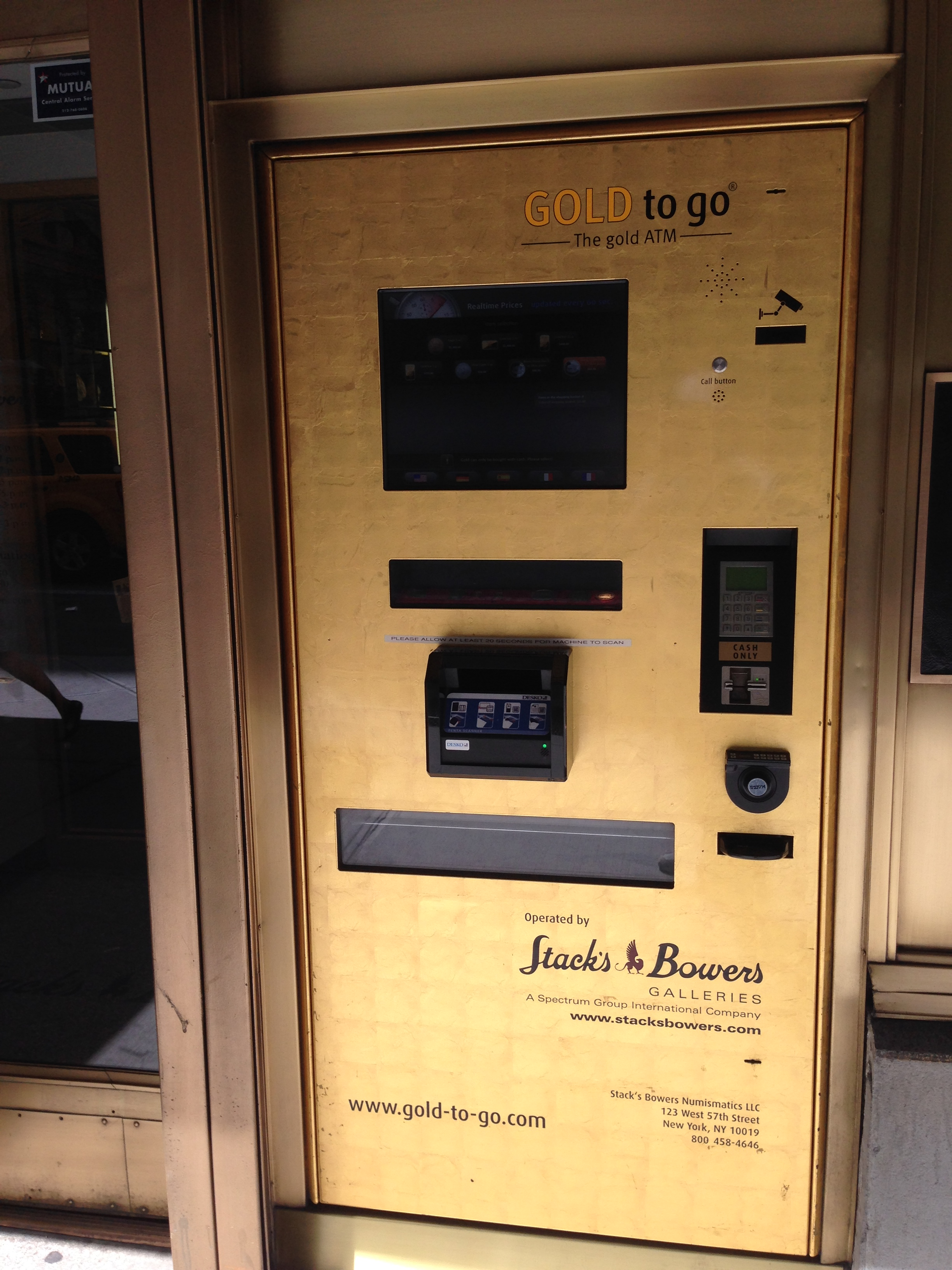
Gold vending ATM in New York City.

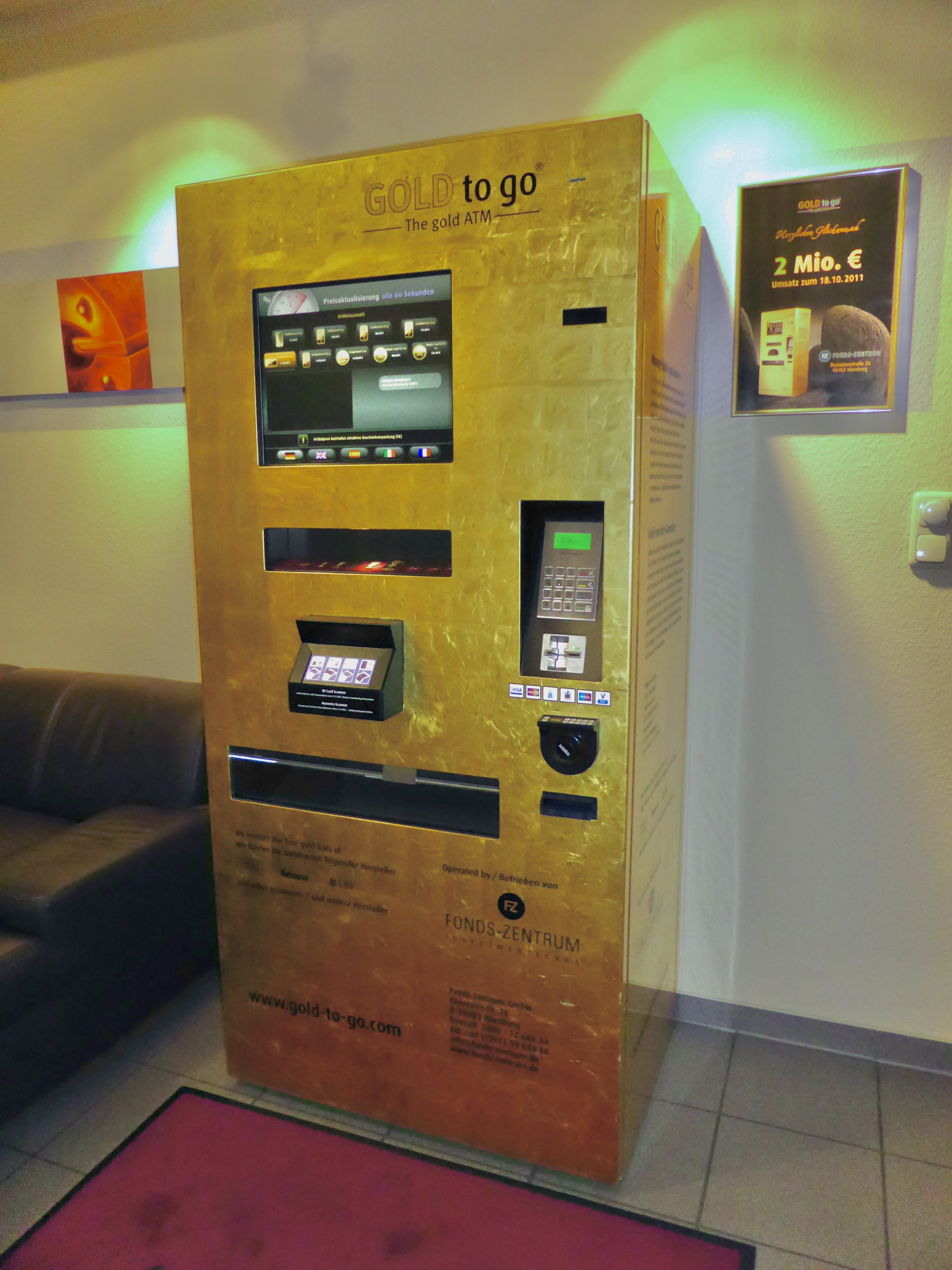
Vending machine in Nürnberg, Germany

Gold to Go is a product brand created by the TG Gold-Super-Markt corporation to dispense items made of pure gold from automated banking vending machines.

The first gold-plated vending machine was located in the lobby of the Emirates Palace hotel in Abu Dhabi and dispensed 320 gold items, including 10-gram gold bars and customized gold coins. As of now, there are six vending machines installed across Europe and Peru.

The first vending machine in the United States was installed in Boca Raton, Florida, in December 2010. The "gold ATMs" are designed to be placed in shopping malls and airports, aiming to make ordinary people comfortable with the idea of investing in gold. The vending machines update their prices to reflect market value minute via an encrypted internet connection.

== History ==
The concept was developed by Thomas Geissler, who previously created an online platform for trading precious metals. He stated that his initial inspiration was observing the "seemingly endless" line of traditional toiletries vending machines at airports and train stations, and during his search for advertising models for an online marketplace. The initial prototype system was installed in Frankfurt in 2009, where it dispensed 1-gram pieces of gold at a 30% premium above market price.

The German corporation planned to distribute 500 "gold ATMs" throughout airports and rail stations in Germany, Austria, and Switzerland. Meanwhile, the company FONDS-Zentrum Nürnberg in Nuremberg Germany bought the assets of the Gold ATMs to distribute the Gold vending machines to private companies or persons.

In 2017, the first gold ATM that had been installed in Dubai, was permanently closed.

== Machines ==
The vending machines are covered in gold leaf, and include a touch screen, cash and credit card slots, and a lighted display showcase. Users must scan identification for purchases exceeding the money laundering limit within a given time. The machines are fitted "like an armored vehicle" and tested with explosives to prevent theft, and include surveillance cameras that record all transactions.

=== Features ===
- It has a state-of-the-art ID scanner with AssureTech validation, which determines quality and value and creates an offer within minutes.
- It monitors real-time prices and gives instant cash for gold, silver, and cryptocurrency.
- It captures and authenticates the user by examining the ID hologram.
- A Video Teller Agent examines each customer in real-time and helps.
- In the case of a technical issue, a video call will be automatically made to customer support.

=== Items ===
Gold bars made of 24-carat gold are sold in 1, 5, 10, 20, 50, 100 and 250 gram and 1 oz sizes. Other items for sale include gift boxes of gold coins with symbols such as the Krugerrand, a maple leaf, or a kangaroo, and are dispensed in "handsome" boxes. Each gold bar is sealed in plastic with an anti-counterfeit hologram label, and comes with a description of its purity and price per gram, as well as information about the sale and the company's 10-day return policy.
