= E-Bullion =

Internet-based digital gold currency

e-Bullion was an Internet-based digital gold currency founded by Jim and Pamela Fayed of Moorpark, California, as part of their Goldfinger Coin & Bullion group of companies. The company was incorporated in 2000 and launched on July 4, 2001. Similar to competing systems such as e-gold, e-Bullion allowed for the instant transfer of gold and silver between user accounts. e-Bullion was a registered legal corporate entity of Panama.

From 2001 to 2008 e-Bullion grew to have over one million users and substantial account transaction volume, and reserves of approximately 50,000 ounces of gold bullion. The company was a competitor to e-gold.com and goldmoney.com.

In 2008, co-founder, Pamela Fayed, was murdered, leading to the indictment, trial and conviction of her husband Jim Fayed for hiring her murder. Fayed was sentenced to death, and is currently on death row in California. As a result of the murder, the U.S. Government seized all of the assets of e-Bullion, resulting in the closure of the company in August 2008. Between 2014 and 2019, the U.S. Government returned approximately $23.3 million in recovered assets to over 1,000 e-Bullion account holders.

== Features ==
E-Bullion simply provided a way for users to hold and transfer balances in gold and silver. The company also offered a debit card to U.S. customers, which enabled them to convert their bullion balances to USD and withdraw at an automated teller machine (ATM) or use it for debit purchases.

- e-Bullion provided its own in-house currency exchange service through Goldfinger Coin & Bullion, Inc. An e-Bullion account could be funded directly via wire transfer from a bank account.
- e-Bullion was the first DGC to issue a debit card linked to an account.
- e-Bullion was the first DGC to use CRYPTOCard security tokens to protect user accounts from unauthorized access.
- Goldfinger Bullion Reserve Corporation, a sister company of e-Bullion, held the precious metals in bullion storage vaults located in Los Angeles, and at the Perth Mint in Australia.

== 2008 Murder of e-Bullion Principal ==
The Fayeds had a troubled marriage which eventually led to divorce proceedings. During the divorce proceedings the Fayeds disputed over the partition of ownership of the Goldfinger companies, including e-Bullion.

On Monday July 28, 2008 Jim Fayed's estranged wife Pamela Fayed was stabbed to death in a parking structure at 1875 Century Park East in Century City, California. The crime occurred at 6:30PM in daylight and was overheard by numerous people who responded to the victim's screams. A surveillance camera recorded enough details for a rental car to be identified by license plate and for a suspect description to be announced. She was due to appear that day in one of several ongoing legal meetings in her divorce from Jim Fayed and was reportedly attempting to stop him from moving or hiding some of the joint assets involved in e-Bullion. As of 4 August 2008 Fayed was in United States federal custody facing felony charges of conducting unlicensed money transactions via e-Bullion. Federal authorities seized $60,000 in cash, $24,000,000 in gold bullion and a credit card that allegedly was used to pay for the rental car that fled from the murder scene.

Fayed was prosecuted for capital murder, was found guilty at trial by a jury, and sentenced to death. He is currently imprisoned on death row in California.

The e-Bullion website was taken down on August 5, 2008. After the site was taken down, it became a simple mirror for this present Wikipedia article. Court papers filed by James Fayed as part of his divorce proceedings indicate that normal website operations would be impossible without his active oversight and direction.

After the arrest of Fayed, the US Attorney unsealed an indictment of e-Bullion and Goldfinger Coin & Bullion for failure to have a money transmitter license under the USA PATRIOT Act. Although the charges against the corporations were eventually dropped, the US Attorney's Office seized all of the assets of the Goldfinger companies, including the bullion backing e-Bullion.com from the Perth Mint and the Fayed's ranch in California.

In July 2012, United States and Australian authorities secured court orders leading to the recovery of approximately $24 million in assets. This included $3.6 million in bank funds and $5.4 million in precious metals seized in the United States, as well as approximately $13.3 million from liquidated precious metals held in Perth, Australia.

Between 2014 and 2019, the U.S. Government returned these recovered funds to e-Bullion victims through several disbursements:

- December 2014: $1.8 million returned to over 300 victims from the “Kum Ventures” scheme
- November 2015: $11.7 million returned to more than 1,000 victims
- April 2019: $9.8 million returned to more than 1,000 victims from gold and silver stored at the Perth mint in Australia

The funds were distributed through a process known as "remission", which allows the government to use forfeited monies to compensate domestic and international victims of crime. The U.S. government identified victims using information obtained from e-Bullion's and GCB's encrypted computer servers stored in California and Switzerland.

== See also ==
- Digital currency exchanger
- PayPal
