= Sunshine Minting =

American metal processing company

Coordinates: 47.733266°N 116.798455°W

Sunshine Minting, Inc.
- Company type: Private
- Industry: Metal manufacturing and processing
- Headquarters: Henderson, Nevada, United States
- Key people: Tom Power, President and CEO
- Products: Precious metals, coins and coin blanks, bullion, medallions
- Number of employees: 200 (2009)
- Website: www.sunshinemint.com

Sunshine Minting, Inc., is a privately held company based in Henderson, Nevada. They left Coeur d'Alene, Idaho in June of 2025. They process silver, gold and other precious metals. It is known as a supplier of silver planchets to the United States Mint and as the manufacturer of the private Liberty Dollar coins.

Sunshine Minting provides custom minting services and has an on-site storage vault program for customers who own at least 10 ounces of gold or 500 ounces of silver.
