= Bernard von NotHaus =

American counterfeiter

Bernard von NotHaus is the creator of the Liberty Dollar and co-founder of the Royal Hawaiian Mint Company in Hawaii. He is also the founder of the Cannabis Spiritual Center, an educational institution that supports the use of marijuana in spiritual settings. Von NotHaus was convicted of counterfeiting in 2011, and was also accused of domestic terrorism. He was sentenced to three years of probation, and was released from probation after serving one year.

According to the evidence introduced during his 2011 federal criminal trial in connection with his involvement with the Liberty Dollar, von NotHaus was the founder of an organization named the National Organization for the Repeal of the Federal Reserve and Internal Revenue Code, commonly known as NORFED and known as Liberty Services. The FBI claimed that NORFED's purpose was to mix Liberty Dollars into the current money of the United States and that NORFED intended for the Liberty Dollar to be used as current money in order to limit reliance on, and to compete with, United States currency.

The silver round, the most popular form of Liberty Dollars, was made of one ounce of .999 fine silver, and the Liberty Dollar certificates were made in different colors and sizes.

== Federal government raid and confiscation ==
In September 2006, U.S. Mint informed Liberty Dollar users that federal prosecutors had determined that the circulation of the medallions as "legal tender" is a federal crime. It was claimed that people were told or led to believe that they were US currency, but proponents of the Liberty Dollar were cautioned against making such a claim. Rather, they were told that it was an "item of barter," and could therefore lawfully be exchanged for other items in trade.

In 2007, about a dozen federal government agents seized nearly two tons of coins that featured the image of Ron Paul, a libertarian Texas congressman. They also took about 500 pounds of silver and 40 to 50 ounces of gold. Von Nothaus and others sued the government on behalf of the many people who were the lawful owners of the silver and gold. Despite the 2011 conviction of Bernard von NotHaus on charges related to the manufacture and distribution of Liberty Dollars, U.S. District Court Judge Richard L. Voorhees ruled in late 2014 that seized property not deemed as contraband should be returned pursuant to ownership claims.

== Criminal charges ==
In connection with the Liberty Dollar business, a federal grand jury brought an indictment against von NotHaus and three others in May 2009, accusing him of counterfeiting U.S. currency. Von NotHaus was arrested on June 6, 2009, and entered a plea of not guilty on July 28.

In at least one interview, von NotHaus had been quoted as saying: "We never refer to the Silver Liberty as a coin, nor as legal tender or current money...The word ‘coin’ is a government-controlled term. This is currency that is free from government control."

On March 18, 2011, after a 90-minute jury deliberation, von NotHaus was found guilty on various counts, including the making of "counterfeit coins" (resembling legal tender coins). U.S. Attorney for the Western District of North Carolina Anne M. Tompkins described Bernard von NotHaus and the Liberty dollar as "a unique form of domestic terrorism" that is trying "to undermine the legitimate currency of this country." The Justice Department press release quotes her as saying: “While these forms of anti-government activities do not involve violence, they are every bit as insidious and represent a clear and present danger to the economic stability of this country".

According to the Associated Press:

Federal prosecutors successfully argued that von NotHaus was, in fact, trying to pass off the silver coins as U.S. currency. Coming in denominations of 5, 10, 20, and 50, the Liberty Dollars also featured a dollar sign, the word "dollar" and the motto "Trust in God," similar to the "In God We Trust" that appears on U.S. coins.:

He appealed his conviction but his appeal was denied on 10 November 2014.

On November 11, 2014, Judge Voorhees denied von NotHaus' motion for acquittal. On December 2, 2014, he was sentenced to six months house arrest, with three years probation.

His probation officer suggested he file for early release from probation after one year, and recommended the early termination to the court. Termination of probation was formally granted.
