= Liberty dollar (private currency) =

Private currency produced in the United States

Liberty Dollar
- American Liberty Dollars

ISO 4217
- Code: none

Units of account
- Symbol: $ or ALD (non-ISO 4217; used for multicurrency accounting)

Denominations
- Banknotes
- Freq. used: $1, $5, $10, $20, $50
- Rarely used: $500, $1000

Demographics
- User(s): Individuals and businesses primarily in the United States

Issuance
- Issuing authority: Liberty Services
- Website: libertydollar.org
- Mint: Sunshine Minting
- Website: sunshinemint.com
- This infobox shows the latest status before this currency was rendered obsolete.

The American Liberty Dollar (ALD) was a private currency produced in the United States.

The currency was issued in minted metal rounds (similar to coins), gold and silver certificates, and electronic currency (eLD). ALD certificates are "warehouse receipts" for real gold and silver owned by the bearer. According to court documents, there were about 250,000 holders of Liberty Dollar certificates. The metal was warehoused at Sunshine Minting in Coeur d'Alene, Idaho prior to a November 2007 raid by the Federal Bureau of Investigation (FBI) and the U.S. Secret Service (USSS). Until July 2009, the Liberty Dollar was distributed by Liberty Services (formerly known as "National Organization for the Repeal of the Federal Reserve and the Internal Revenue Code" or NORFED), based in Evansville, Indiana. It was created by Bernard von NotHaus, the founder of the Cannabis Spiritual Center in Malibu, California, and the co-founder of the Royal Hawaiian Mint Company.

In May 2009, von NotHaus and others were charged with federal crimes in connection with the Liberty Dollar, and, on July 31, 2009, von NotHaus announced that he had closed the Liberty Dollar operation, pending resolution of the criminal charges. On March 18, 2011, von NotHaus was pronounced guilty of "making coins resembling and similar to United States coins". In late 2014, a U.S. District Court judge ruled that Liberty Dollars seized in the 2007 FBI/USSS operation should be returned to their owners.

== Practices ==
=== Exchange service ===
From 1998 to July 2009, Liberty Services exchanged Federal Reserve Notes (U.S. dollars) for silver Liberty Dollars (and later gold and copper), as well as for Warehouse Receipts in both paper and digital forms.

=== Currency reform ===
Liberty Services' original name was "National Organization for the Repeal of the Federal Reserve and the Internal Revenue Code" (NORFED). Since its founding, the organization asserted that the Federal Reserve was unconstitutional and harmful. The company engaged in a series of legal battles both defending their exchange service and challenging exclusivity assertions made by the US Mint (see Legal issues).

=== Politics ===
Ron Paul Dollars were also briefly minted, taking advantage of Ron Paul's public favoring of metals backed currency and the Ron Paul presidential campaign, 2008. However, this raised issues of its legality amid an FBI raid confiscating two tons of the coins. This briefly caught the attentions of the media, taking note of its novelty over any actual value.

We would greatly prefer that folks would just donate rather than buy a Ron Paul dollar, we think that’s the best way to help out Ron Paul.

— Jesse Benton, campaign spokesman

== Function ==
=== Differences from other alternative currencies ===
A number of alternative currencies exist in the United States, including Phoenix Dollars, Goldbacks, Baltimore's BNote, Ithaca Hours, Bitcoin, and digital gold currency. Unlike some other alternative currencies, both Liberty Dollars and Phoenix Dollars were denominated by weight and backed by a commodity: Liberty Dollars used gold, silver, platinum, or copper. Other private currencies use different bases, such as tying their value to a specific unit of time; i.e., 1 hour = 1 Time Dollar. Under the most simplistic version of that model, the future value of the currency would depend on the willingness of people to swap their labor, regardless of the market value of the labor provided. However, systems such as Ithaca Hours have introduced more sophisticated models that allow for variations in market value of labor. Liberty Dollars also differed from other alternative currencies in that they carried a suggested US dollar face value.

The only laws that pertain to private currencies are ordinary statutes against fraud. Coining is more technologically difficult than is printing, and inclusion of precious metal in coins has long been seen as a means of "embedding" value into them. The Liberty Dollar consisted of coins and printed notes. Paper and digital Liberty Dollars were legally defined as warehouse receipts and were backed by a physical commodity: a weight in precious metal. 18 USC 486, however, makes it a crime to make, utter, or pass any coin or bar of gold, silver, or any other metal if it is intended to be used as money, so there is a definitive injunction against the minting of coins for that purpose.

=== Liberty Dollar base values, discounts, and commissions ===
The Liberty Dollar "base value" was created by Bernard von NotHaus. As of 2009, the base value of the Liberty Dollar was $20 Liberty Dollars to one ounce of silver. At the time the Liberty Dollar operation was closed, one ounce Liberty Dollar gold pieces were denominated $1,000 with a maximum charge of 10% over spot price with membership. The previous base values were $10 silver ounce, $20 silver ounce and $500 gold ounce. Non-members paid full face value for all currency except for certain Special and Numismatic items. Members' discounts ranged from 0% to 50%+ (actually, for short periods during crossovers it was possible that even members could not buy Liberty Dollars at face value or less).

Liberty Dollar associates and merchants used to exchange for Liberty Dollars at a discount, so they could "make money when [they] spend money." To further distinguish how the Liberty Dollar worked, von NotHaus transitioned to a commission structure in June 2007 where associates and merchants received a commission in the form of extra Liberty Dollars when they placed their orders. Regional currency officers received larger discounts; they were the regional distributors and official representatives of Liberty Services.

The Liberty Dollar associate and merchant discounts ranged from 0.0%–50%+ (zero to more than fifty percent) depending on where the price of silver was, relative to the Liberty Dollar base value, the Liberty Dollar base value crossover points, and the time periods during which the price stayed above varying moving-day averages over 30, 60 or 90 days in a fluctuating market, based on Liberty Dollar formulas worked out by von NotHaus.

=== Regional currency office ===
A "regional currency office" was a kind of distributor of Liberty Dollars. In exchange for a fee paid to the Liberty Dollar Organization, they could purchase Liberty dollars for resale at a discount. They were also authorized to purchase, convert, or perhaps exchange Liberty Dollars for Federal Reserve Notes.

== Legal issues ==
=== Federal Government response ===
Numerous individuals within the U.S. Government have been interviewed regarding the Liberty Dollar. The Liberty Dollar organization asserted one Secret Service agent claimed "It's not counterfeit money" while remaining "skeptical" of NORFED. Another agent reportedly warned that the Liberty Dollar "appears to be in violation of 18 U.S.C. § 514." The minting of Liberty Dollar coins also appears to be in violation of 18 U.S.C. § 486:

Whoever, except as authorized by law, makes or utters or passes, or attempts to utter or pass, any coins of gold or silver or other metal, or alloys of metals, intended for use as current money, whether in the resemblance of coins of the United States or of foreign countries, or of original design, shall be fined under this title or imprisoned not more than five years, or both.

The promoter of the Liberty Dollar asserts that Claudia Dickens, spokeswoman for the U.S. Treasury Department's Bureau of Engraving and Printing, had previously said American Liberty Currency is legitimate. Dickens was quoted as having said "There's nothing illegal about this", after the Treasury Department's legal team reviewed the currency. "As long as it doesn't say 'legal tender' there's nothing wrong with it."

In 2006 the U.S. Mint issued a press release stating that prosecutors at the Justice Department had determined that using Liberty Dollars as circulating money is a federal crime. The press release also stated that the "Liberty Dollars" are meant to compete with the circulating coinage (currency) of the United States and such competition consequently is a criminal act. The Justice Department also stated that the Liberty Dollar was confusingly similar to actual U.S. currency, and the language used on NORFED's website was deceptive.

The Liberty Dollar organization responded to the Mint's press release by stating that "[t]he Liberty Dollar never has claimed to be, does not claim to be, is not, and does not purport to be, legal tender." The promoters of the Liberty Dollar have asserted that the Liberty Dollar is not legal tender, and that legal tender and barter are mutually exclusive concepts. The promoter asserts that the Liberty Dollar is a numismatic piece or medallion which may be used voluntarily as barter.

=== Bernard von NotHaus v. the U.S. Mint ===
On March 20, 2007, Liberty Services owner Bernard von NotHaus filed suit in the District Court for the Southern District of Indiana against the U.S. Mint's claims regarding the Liberty Dollar. Defendants include Henry M. Paulson, Secretary of the Treasury; Alberto R. Gonzales, former Attorney General of the United States; and Edmund C. Moy, Director of the Mint. The suit sought a declaratory judgment that circulating Liberty Dollars as a voluntary barter currency is not a federal crime and an injunction barring the Defendants from publicly or privately declaring the Liberty Dollar an illegal currency and to remove any such declarations from the U.S. Mint's website.

=== FBI / Secret Service raid ===
The Liberty Dollar offices were raided by agents of the Federal Bureau of Investigation (FBI) and the U.S. Secret Service (USSS) on November 14, 2007. Bernard von NotHaus, the owner of Liberty Services, sent an email to customers and supporters saying that the agents took all the gold, silver, and platinum, and almost two tons of Ron Paul Dollars. The agents also seized computers and files and froze the Liberty Dollar bank accounts. Von NotHaus's email linked to a signup page for a class action lawsuit so that the victims might recover their assets. At the same time, all forms on his website relating to purchases of Liberty Dollars became nonfunctional.

Copies of the email and the warrant documents have been posted to the website. The seizure warrant was issued for money laundering, mail fraud, wire fraud, counterfeiting, and conspiracy.

The local Evansville Courier & Press reported the email, stating that "FBI Agent Wendy Osborne, a spokeswoman for the FBI's Indianapolis office, directed all questions on the raid to the Western District of North Carolina U.S. Attorney's Office. A spokeswoman there said she had no information on the investigation. Bernard von NotHaus, the group's monetary architect and the author of the email, did not immediately respond to a message seeking comment."

The Associated Press quoted von NotHaus on November 16, 2007, as saying that the federal government was "running scared right now and they had to do something .... I'm volunteering to meet the agents and get arrested so we can thrash this out in court."

=== Indictment ===
A federal grand jury brought an indictment against von NotHaus and three others in May 2009 in United States District Court in Statesville, North Carolina, and von NotHaus was arrested on June 6, 2009. Bernard von NotHaus was charged with one count of conspiracy to possess and sell coins in resemblance and similitude of coins of a denomination higher than five cents, and silver coins in resemblance of genuine coins of the United States in denominations of five dollars and greater, in violation of 18 U.S.C. § 485, 18 U.S.C. § 486, and 18 U.S.C. § 371; one count of mail fraud in violation of 18 U.S.C. § 1341 and 18 U.S.C. § 2; one count of selling, and possessing with intent to defraud, coins of resemblance and similitude of United States coins in denominations of five cents and higher, in violation of 18 U.S.C. § 485 and 18 U.S.C. § 2; and one count of uttering, passing, and attempting to utter and pass, silver coins in resemblance of genuine U.S. coins in denominations of five dollars or greater, in violation of 18 U.S.C. § 486 and 18 U.S.C. § 2.

On July 28, 2009, von NotHaus entered a plea of not guilty.

=== Conviction ===
On March 18, 2011, von NotHaus was convicted of "making, possessing and selling his own coins", after a jury in Statesville, North Carolina deliberated for less than two hours. The jury found him guilty of one count under 18 U.S.C. § 485 and 18 U.S.C. § 2, one count of violating 18 U.S.C. § 486 and 18 U.S.C. § 2, and one count of conspiracy, under 18 U.S.C. § 371, to violate sections 485 and 486. He faces up to 15 years in prison, a $250,000 fine, and may be forced to give $7 million worth of minted coins and precious metals to the government, weighing 16,000 pounds. Attorney for the Western District of North Carolina, Anne M. Tompkins, described the Liberty Dollar as "a unique form of domestic terrorism" that is trying "to undermine the legitimate currency of this country". The Justice Department press release quotes her as saying: "While these forms of anti-government activities do not involve violence, they are every bit as insidious and represent a clear and present danger to the economic stability of this country."

According to the Associated Press, "Federal prosecutors successfully argued that von NotHaus was, in fact, trying to pass off the silver coins as U.S. currency. Coming in denominations of 5, 10, 20, and 50, the Liberty Dollars also featured a dollar sign, the word "dollar" and the motto "Trust in God," similar to the "In God We Trust" that appears on U.S. coins".

== Post-conviction ==
Since his trial, The New York Times has said that his followers describe von NotHaus as "the Rosa Parks of the constitutional currency movement."

He appealed his conviction, but his appeal was denied on November 10, 2014.

On November 11, 2014, Judge Voorhees denied von NotHaus's Motion for Acquittal. On December 2, 2014, despite prosecutor demands that he serve as much as 23 years in Federal prison, he was sentenced to 6 months house arrest, with 3 years probation. As part of his reasoning for delivering a greatly reduced sentence from what Federal Prosecutors demanded, Judge Richard L. Voorhees considered von NotHaus's appeal, which stated:

...if anything is clear from the evidence presented at trial, it is that the last thing Mr. von NotHaus wanted was for Liberty Dollars [to] be confused with coins issued by the United States government...His intention – to protest the Federal Reserve system – has always been plain. The jury's verdict conflates a program created to function as an alternative to the Federal Reserve system with one designed to [deceive] people into believing it was the very thing Mr. von NotHaus was protesting in the first place...the Liberty Dollars was not a counterfeit and was not intended to function as such. The verdict is a perversion of the counterfeiting statutes and should be set aside.

The conviction, which was seen as a victory for the government, has now defined 18 U.S.C. § 486 as prohibiting the use of silver bullion, or any other metal coin or bar not issued under government authority, from being used as currency in commerce. The Silver Certificates issued by Liberty Services were not considered any form of counterfeiting or violation of law.

Bernard von NotHaus's probation officer suggested he file for early release from probation after one year, and recommended the early termination to the court. Termination of probation was formally granted December 9, 2015 by U.S. District Judge Richard L. Voorhees.

When asked about the government's motive for accusing him of terrorism, von NotHaus scoffed, "This is the United States government. It's got all the guns, all the surveillance, all the tanks, it has nuclear weapons, and it's worried about some ex-surfer guy making his own money? Give me a break!"

=== Forfeiture trial ===
The forfeiture trial was scheduled to resume Monday, April 4, 2011. Federal prosecutors were seeking to take roughly $7 million worth or five tons in Liberty Dollars minted in gold and silver seized in 2007 from a warehouse by the FBI and USSS.

=== Liberty Dollars are returned ===
In 2017, a significant number of seized Liberty Dollars were returned to their owners after petitions were made to the court for this return.

== See also ==
- American Silver Eagle
- Bitcoin
- Commodity money
- Complementary currency
- Counter-economics
- Criticism of the Federal Reserve
- Free banking
- Goldback
- Grassroots democracy
- Inflation hedge
- List of community currencies in the United States
- Local currency
- Private currency
- Sacagawea dollar
- Silver as an investment
- Silver standard
