= Zürich Gold Pool =

The Zürich Gold Pool was founded in 1968 by the largest banks in Switzerland. The establishment was triggered by the temporary closing of the London bullion market which marked the collapse of the London Gold Pool, a system of maintaining the Bretton Woods System of fixed-rate convertible currencies and defending a gold price of US$35 per troy ounce by interventions in the London market.

The consequences of the collapse of the London Gold Pool, such as the closing of the London bullion market, caused significant instability in the trading and valuation of gold. Without a market, the South African gold producers sought alternative trading partners. The accompanied weakness of the British pound ended the world dominance of London as the major exchange of gold bullion. Swiss banks acted immediately to minimize effects on the Swiss banking system and its currency. By informal agreements between Union Bank of Switzerland (UBS), Swiss Bank Corporation, and Credit Suisse, these banks established a gold trading arrangement, the Zürich Gold Pool. The pool, especially UBS, immediately became the major financial partner of the South African suppliers. Having no indigenous national gold supplies, the Swiss gold market in Zürich developed and maintained a dominance in gold bullion trading by offering specialized account and banking services based on the country's confidentiality laws for banking. By the 1970s Zürich was established as the major trading location for gold, trading some 70% of the worlds total production of gold.

== See also ==
- Exchange rates
- Gold as an investment
- Gold standard
- Metal as money
- Price fixing
