= Financial Coalition Against Child Pornography =

Coalition of companies that seeks to eliminate commercial child pornography

The Financial Coalition Against Child Pornography (FCACP) is a coalition of credit card issuers and Internet services companies that seeks to eliminate commercial child pornography by taking action on the payment systems that are used to fund these illegal operations.

In 2006, the International Centre for Missing & Exploited Children (ICMEC), the National Center for Missing & Exploited Children (NCMEC), and a number of banks, credit card companies, electronic and third party payment networks, and e-gold created the Financial Coalition Against Child Pornography. The Financial Coalition consists of 34 banks, payment companies, and internet services companies.

Senator Richard C. Shelby (R-AL), Chairman of the U.S. Senate Banking, Housing, and Urban Affairs Committee, was the catalyst in bringing these industry leaders together to address the problem.

Members of the Coalition include America Online, American Express Company, Authorize.net, Bank of America, Capital One, Chase Bank, Citigroup, Discover Financial, First Data, First National Bank of Omaha, Google, HSBC - NA, JP Morgan Chase, MasterCard, Microsoft, North American Bancard, Nova Information Systems, PayPal, First PREMIER Bank/PREMIER Bankcard, Standard Chartered Bank, Visa, Washington Mutual, Wells Fargo, and Yahoo! Inc.

This American-based effort expanded regionally with the creation of the Asia Pacific Financial Coalition in August 2009. The Coalition's initial objective was to make people and companies aware of the issue of online child sexual abuse, and how its sale and distribution was being conducted across payment and technology platforms. In 2013, the Asia Pacific FCACP/ICMEC published "Confronting New Challenges in the Fight Against Child Pornography: Best Practices to Help File Hosting and File Sharing Companies Fight the Distribution of Child Sexual Exploitation Content."
