= Tim Jackson (businessman) =

British businessman (born 1965)

A former student at City of London School and Merton College, Oxford, Tim Jackson (born 1965) founded QXL.com, an online auction service, which went public in 1999 at a valuation of around $400m. The company merged with its largest German rival, Ricardo, was renamed Tradus, and was sold to African media group Naspers for around $2 billion in December 2007.

Between 1999 and 2001, Jackson was managing director of Carlyle Internet Partners Europe, a $700m fund that invests in European technology businesses. He remains a senior advisor to Carlyle and is in demand as a speaker and writer.

At the World Economic Forum in Davos 2001, Jackson was selected as one of the 100 "Global Leaders of Tomorrow". In a survey by Business 2.0 magazine amongst new economy business people, he was judged the second most important person they would like to have in their contact book.

He currently (2014) leads Walking Ventures a seed fund which invests in early-stage Internet and other technology startups based in Europe.

Jackson has also written a number of books.

== Publications ==
- Inside Intel: Andy Grove and the Rise of the World's Most Powerful Chip Company. Dutton Adult. 1997
- Richard Branson, Virgin King: Inside Richard Branson's Business Empire. Prima Lifestyles. 1998. (a biography of Richard Branson)
- Turning Japanese: The Fight for Industrial Control of the New Europe. HarperCollins. 1993
