= E-gold =

Digital gold currency

G&SR (e-gold Operator) office, 1998–2014, Melbourne, Florida

E-gold or eGold was a digital gold currency operated by Gold & Silver Reserve Inc. (G&SR) that allowed users to make payments, which it called "spends", in grams of gold, silver, and other precious metals. E-gold was launched in 1996 and grew to five million accounts by 2009, when transfers were suspended due to legal issues. At its peak in 2006, e-gold processed more than US$2 billion worth of spends per year, backed by over US$85 million worth of gold, about 3.8 tonnes (8,400 lb). e-gold Ltd. was incorporated in Nevis, Saint Kitts and Nevis, and its operations were based in Florida.

== Beginnings ==
E-gold was founded by Douglas Jackson, a radiation oncologist, and Barry Downey, an attorney, in 1996. The pair originally backed e-gold accounts with gold coins stored in a safe deposit box in Melbourne, Florida. When e-gold was at its peak, the company stored its gold and platinum in bank vaults in London and Dubai.

By 1998, G&SR was an affiliate member of NACHA and a full member of NACHA's Internet council. The company experienced exponential growth starting in 2000. In a July 13, 1999, article in the Financial Times, Tim Jackson (no relation to Douglas) described e-gold as "the only electronic currency that has achieved critical mass on the web". In 2001, the company said that e-gold had more than 200,000 accounts and more than $14 million of digital gold currency in circulation. By 2004, there were over a million accounts.

By the early 2000s, the capability of immediate settlement, as implemented by e-gold, was recognized as key to the emergence of systems for peer-to-peer transfers of digital rights such as "smart contracts".

E-gold was a founding member of the Financial Coalition Against Child Pornography. In 2005 and 2006, the company took effective action to combat child exploitation.

== Criminal abuse ==
E-gold was a target of financial malware and phishing scams by criminal syndicates and was used for illegal activities. In December 2005, the Federal Bureau of Investigation (FBI) raided G&SR's offices, seizing files and hardware, as part of an investigation into e-gold's use in criminal activities. A month later, no charges had been filed against Jackson or his businesses.

=== Hackers ===
Because of e-gold's hard money and non-repudiation policies, it was an early and particularly attractive target of phishing attacks against its users. Attackers also exploited flaws in the Microsoft Windows operating systems and Internet Explorer web browser to collect account details from millions of computers to compromise online accounts, including e-gold accounts. In the first half of 2004, e-gold implemented one-time passwords to improve its security.

Jackson said that e-gold is a book entry system with account histories, making it possible to identify users who had engaged in illicit activity. e-gold accounts were pseudonymous, allowing an account's creator to use any name. Law enforcement could use e-gold's account and transaction records, cross-referenced with data from exchangers, to identify criminal users of the service.

=== Fraud ===
In a lengthy article in BusinessWeek's January 9, 2006, issue, a reporter wrote that online payment systems, including e-gold, have become popular among merchants engaged in carding, identity theft, and money laundering. Jackson said that his company has an investigative staff that responds to inquiries from law enforcement agencies, and that his company does not cater to criminals.

The Western Express Cybercrime Group, a five-man fraud syndicate based in Eastern Europe, engaged in carding, selling illegally obtained goods and using e-gold and other digital currencies to store the proceeds.

== Prosecution and closure ==
In 2007, a U.S. federal grand jury indicted e-gold, accusing it of money laundering, conspiracy, and operating an unlicensed money transmitting business, stating that it knew its service was being abused by identity thieves and child pornographers but did not do enough to stop them. The company denied the charges. In July 2008, the company and its three directors entered into a plea agreement. Douglas Jackson pleaded guilty to operation of an unlicensed money transmitting business and conspiracy to engage in money laundering. In November 2008, Jackson was sentenced to 300 hours of community service, a $200 fine, and three years of supervision, including six months of electronically monitored home detention. Jackson had faced a maximum sentence of 20 years in prison and a $500,000 fine. Judge Rosemary Collyer opted for a much more lenient sentence because of Jackson's significant personal debt. "Dr. Jackson has suffered, will continue to suffer, and may never be successful with e-Gold," said the judge.

Reid Jackson, Douglas's brother, and Barry Downey, a company director, were each sentenced to three years of probation and 300 hours of community service, and ordered to pay a $2,500 fine and a $100 assessment.

E-gold's plea agreement included a forfeiture of about $1.2 million to the government, a $300,000 fine, and a condition that Douglas Jackson impose know your customer (KYC) rules on e-gold customers. Customers who lived in high-risk countries or who had not completed KYC verification were limited to low or no transaction rates. e-gold announced a claims process in December 2010, and launched it in June 2013, for account holders to access the funds they had deposited. As of November 2013, users could not use e-gold's web site for other purposes. Jackson told the Financial Times in a November 2013 article that he had hoped to resurrect e-gold himself, but that he had not been able to obtain the licenses required in most US states.

== See also ==
- Digital currency
- Digital currency exchanger
- Gold as an investment
- Liberty Reserve
