= Liberty Reserve =

Digital currency and money transfer service

Liberty Reserve S.A.
- Company type: Sociedad Anónima
- Website type: E-commerce payment system
- Founded: 2006
- Dissolved: May 2013
- Headquarters: Costa Rica
- Services: Digital currency transfer
- Launched: 2001 (?)
- Current status: Inactive (taken offline by regulators)

Liberty Reserve was a Costa Rica-based centralized digital currency service that billed itself as the "oldest, safest and most popular payment processor, serving millions all around a world". Liberty Reserve was conceived as a "PayPal for the unbanked," allowing the 2.5 billion people without bank accounts or credit histories to participate in the modern economy. The site had over one million users when it was shut down by the United States government. Prosecutors argued that due to lax security, alleged criminal activity largely went undetected, which ultimately led to them seizing the service.

In May 2013, Liberty Reserve was shut down by United States federal prosecutors under the Patriot Act after an investigation by authorities across 17 countries. The United States charged founder Arthur Budovsky and six others with money laundering and operating an unlicensed financial transaction company. Liberty Reserve is alleged to have been used to launder more than $6 billion in criminal proceeds during its history.

== Background ==
Based in San José, Costa Rica, Liberty Reserve was a centralized digital currency service that allowed users to register and transfer money to other users with only a name, e-mail address, and birth date. No efforts were made by the site to verify identities of its users, making it an attractive payment processor to scam artists. Deposits could be made through third parties using a credit card or bankwire, among other deposit options. Liberty Reserve did not directly process deposits or withdrawals. Deposited funds were then "converted" into Liberty Reserve Dollars or Liberty Reserve Euros, which were tied to the value of the U.S. dollar and the euro, respectively, or to ounces of gold. No limits were placed on transaction sizes. The service made money by charging a small fee, about 1%, on each transfer. Transactions were "100% irrevocable". Liberty Reserve also offered shopping cart functionality and other merchant services.

Service was popular among currency brokers and multilevel marketing companies. According to Forex Magnates, a specialized forex news service, Liberty Reserve was "the leading payment channel for traders in emerging and frontier markets." Richard Weber, head of the U.S. Internal Revenue Service criminal investigation unit, declared, "If Al Capone were alive today, this is how he would be hiding his money". At the time of its closure, Liberty Reserve had more than 1 million registered users, 200,000 of which were from the United States. It was a member of the Global Digital Currency Association.

Liberty employees were required to sign a confidentiality agreement to "maintain in strict confidentiality all information" about the company, including "administrative affairs, operations and financial details" for 15 years after leaving the company. Additionally, they were required to notify management if issued a warrant to reveal such information.

== History ==
From 2002 to 2006, United States businessmen Arthur Budovsky and Vladimir Kats ran a digital currency exchange service known as Gold Age. In July 2006, the duo were indicted in New York on charges of operating an illegal financial business, a felony. They were sentenced to five years in prison in 2007, but the sentence was reduced to five years of probation. Budovsky fled the country, settling in Costa Rica. He subsequently became a naturalized citizen of Costa Rica when he married a Costa Rican woman in 2010, and renounced his American citizenship in 2012.

Liberty Reserve was incorporated by Budovsky in Costa Rica in 2006. A 2007 interview with Joul Lee, the company's marketing manager, claimed it was founded as "a private currency exchange system for import/export businesses" and opened to the public in 2007.

=== Criminal investigation and charges ===
Costa Rican authorities became aware of Liberty Reserve in 2009 and informed the business it needed a license to operate as a money transmitting business. In 2011, Liberty Reserve was denied a business license in Costa Rica, according to state prosecutor José Pablo González, due to lack of transparency about how the business was funded. The business formally disbanded at that time, but company founder Arthur Budovsky continued to operate the business by funneling it through five other Costa Rican businesses, according to authorities. A criminal investigation was launched March 7, 2011 following "suspicious" bank activity. Later in 2011, the United States authorities asked Costa Rica to begin investigating Budovsky's business dealings. According to Bernardita Marín, associate director of the Costa Rican Drug Institute, Costa Rica seized funds from Liberty Reserve on three occasions from 2011 to 2013.

In 2011, Liberty Reserve was linked to (unrelated) attempts to sell thousands of stolen Australian bank account numbers and British bank cards. In 2012, a group of hackers attempted to blackmail antivirus software company Symantec into transferring $50,000 into a Liberty Reserve account.

==== 2013 seizure ====
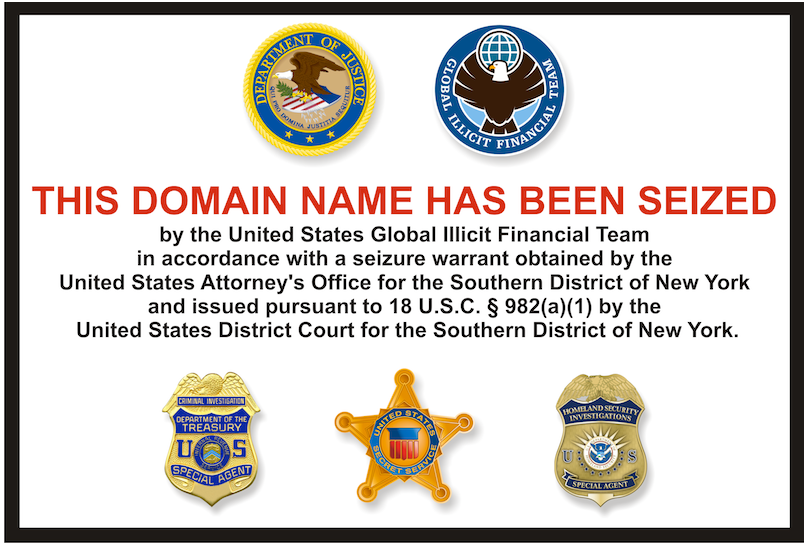
Domain name seizure notice, citing 18 U.S.C. § 982(a)(1)

After a multi-year investigation by officials in 17 countries, a sealed indictment was issued by the U.S. government in May 2013. U.S. prosecutors filed a case against Liberty Reserve, alleging it had handled $6 billion of criminal proceeds. Arthur Budovsky was arrested by Spanish police at Madrid's Barajas International Airport as he attempted to return to Costa Rica, where he had citizenship. Budovsky and a second man were ordered jailed by Spanish authorities pending an extradition hearing. Earlier, three homes and the five apparent shell businesses owned by Budovsky were raided. Four others, including Kats, were arrested across Costa Rica, Spain, and the U.S., while two remain at large in Costa Rica.

The Liberty Reserve website was taken offline on May 24 and replaced with a notice saying the domain had been "seized by the United States Global Illicit Financial Team." In Costa Rica, a court order was issued to seize the "financial products and services" of Budovsky, Maxim Chukharev, and the six apparent shell companies. More than a million dollars of luxury automobiles alone were seized.

The indictment, unsealed on May 28, charges the seven principal employees, as well as Liberty Reserve itself, with money laundering and operating an unlicensed money transmitting business, and seeks $25 million in damages. The charges were leveled using a provision of the Patriot Act, since Liberty Reserve was not an American company. The accused could face up to 30 years in prison.

Preet Bharara, a United States prosecutor working on the case called Liberty Reserve a "black market bank", created and structured to "facilitate criminal activity". In total, Liberty Reserve "processed an estimated 55 million separate financial transactions and is believed to have laundered more than $6 billion in criminal proceeds". It has been linked to crimes including credit card fraud, identity theft, investment fraud, computer hacking, child pornography and narcotics trafficking.

Liberty Reserve itself was accused by U.S. prosecutors of moving tens of millions of dollars through shell accounts. Forty-five bank accounts were seized or restricted by the United States federal prosecutors under the Patriot Act as a result of the investigation. The U.S. attorney in Manhattan, Preet Bharara, stated the case "may be the largest international money laundering case ever brought by the United States." "The global enforcement action we announce today is an important step towards reining in the 'Wild West' of illicit Internet banking," Bharara said; "As crime goes increasingly global, the long arm of the law has to get even longer, and in this case, it encircled the earth."

One specific allegation of the prosecutors is that the site played a role in laundering the $45 million stolen from the Bank of Muscat and the National Bank of Ras Al Khaimah in May 2013.

== Aftermath ==
According to Internet security analyst Brian Krebs, the closure of Liberty Reserve had the potential to "cause a major upheaval in the cybercrime economy". The closure of the site led to many individuals using the service for legitimate reasons losing access to their money. The head of EPay Tarjeta, a service which used Liberty Reserve, remarked, "We seem to be acceptable collateral damage... we have committed no crime."

United States attorney Preet Bharara stated users of Liberty Reserve could contact his office to inquire about getting their funds returned.

On May 29, Budovsky's wife came forward with an accusation that she had been paid $800 to marry him in 2010 so that he could become a Costa Rican citizen. According to her, the plan was to divorce two years later, although the couple were still married at the time of his arrest.

In December 2014, chief technology officer Mark Marmilev was given the maximum sentence of five years after pleading guilty to operating an "unlicensed money transmitting business."

In January 2016, Arthur Budovsky pleaded guilty to one count of conspiring to commit money laundering. On May 6, 2016, Budovsky was sentenced to 20 years in prison.

== See also ==
- e-gold
