= Digital gold currency =

Electronic money

Digital gold currency (DGC) is a form of digital currency based on mass units of gold. The typical unit of account for such currency is linked to grams or troy ounces of gold, although other units such as the gold dinar are sometimes used. DGCs are backed by gold through unallocated or allocated gold storage. A digital gold currency could be a kind of representative money if it is exchangeable for gold on demand (like, for example, a historical United States gold certificate).

Digital gold currencies are issued by a number of companies, each of which provides a system that enables its users to pay each other.

== Features ==
Proponents claim that DGC offers a truly global and borderless world currency system which is independent of exchange rate variations and political manipulation. Unlike fractional-reserve banking, DGCs hold 100% of clients' funds in reserve as gold, silver, and/or platinum, which can be exchanged via digital certificates. Proponents of DGC systems say that deposits are protected against inflation, devaluation and other economic risks inherent in fiat currencies. These risks include the monetary policy of countries or territories, which are said by proponents to be harmful to the value of paper currency.

=== Bullion investing ===
All of the other digital gold-backed currency systems can be used to buy, hold, and sell precious metals, but do not promote themselves as an "investment", as this implies an anticipated return.

=== Exchanging national currency ===
Some providers do not sell DGC directly to clients. For those DGCs, e-currency must be bought and sold via a digital currency exchanger.

Currency exchangers accept payment in national currencies by a variety of methods, including Bank Wire, Direct Deposit, Cheque, Money Order. Some exchangers also sell and fund pre-paid debit cards to make it easier for their clientele to convert DGC into an easily spendable form of national currency.

DGCs are known as private currency as they are not issued by governments.

=== Non-reversible transactions ===
Unlike the credit card industry, digital gold currency issuers generally do not have services to dispute or reverse charges. So, reversing transactions, even in case of a legitimate error, unauthorized use, or failure of a vendor to supply goods is difficult, if not impossible. This means that using digital gold currency is more akin to a cash transaction, while PayPal transfers, for example, could be considered more similar to credit card transactions.

The advantage of this agreement is that the operating costs of the digital currency system are significantly reduced because of the shortage of settlement of payment disputes. Plus, it allows to instantly clear digital gold currency transactions, making the funds immediately available to the recipient. Unlike credit cards, checks, ACH, and other reversible payment methods, there are typically 72 hours or more to clear.

== Risks ==
As with all financial media, there are several types of risk inherent to the use of DGCs: management risk, political risk, data security and exchange risk.

=== Management and political risks ===
DGCs, like all financial institutions and public securities, have a layer of risk in the form of the management of the issuing institution. Controls aimed to limit management risk are called "governance".

All other DGC providers operate under self-regulation. DGC providers are not banks and therefore not subject to many bank regulations that pertain to fractional reserve lending as they do not engage in lending. However, DGCs do provide a method for transferring currency from one person to another, and therefore may fall under regulations pertaining to money transmitting in various jurisdictions.

The Global Digital Currency Association (GDCA), which was founded in 2002, is a non-profit association of online currency operators, exchangers, merchants and users. The GDCA is an example of the DGC industry's attempt at self-regulation. On their website they claim their goal is to "further the interests of the industry as a whole and help with fighting fraud and other illegal activities, arbitrate disputes and act as escrow agent when and where required." Of the once DGC providers, Pecunix (gone, see below), Liberty Reserve (shut down for money laundering in 2013), and eight others became members of the association. It costs one gram of gold to file a complaint if you are not a member, and the list of filable complaints is not exhaustive. Their domain name is registered anonymously through domains by proxy, see whois.

==== OS-Gold, Standard Reserve and INTGold ====
Several companies claiming to be Digital Gold Currencies sprang up and failed between 1999 and 2004, such as OS-Gold, Standard Reserve and INTGold. All these companies failed because the principals diverted deposits for other purposes instead of holding them in the form of gold. In each of these cases, account holders lost several million dollars' worth of gold when the "institution" failed.

==== e-gold ====
e-gold was a digital gold currency founded in 1996. A legal case was brought against e-gold in April 2007 that included violations of 18 U.S. Code § 1960 (Prohibition of unlicensed money transmitting businesses). e-gold vigorously contested the § 1960 charges brought against it in April 2007 for more than a year. In July 2008, following a ruling from the court that effectively enshrined in case law the Treasury Department's expansion of the definition of "money transmitter", e-gold entered into a plea agreement that detailed actions required to bring the companies into compliance with laws and regulations governing operation of a money transmitting business. Although e-gold complied with all other terms of its plea agreement, it was not able to obtain money transmitting licenses due to its guilty plea. Since returning value to customers could constitute money transmitting without a license, e-gold entered into an agreement in 2010 with the US Government to enable e-gold account holders to claim the "monetized value" of their accounts, collectively valued in excess of 90 million US Dollars.

==== 1mdc ====
1mdc was a digital gold currency backed by e-gold rather than by physical gold. On 27 April 2007, a US court ordered e-gold to freeze or block the e-gold accounts 1mdc used to back the digital gold currency it issued. Before the year was out, the 1mdc website was no longer accessible.

==== e-Bullion ====
E-Bullion was a digital-gold currency exchange that had risen, then become defunct around 2008.

In August 2008, James Fayed, the owner and chief executive official of the E-Bullion Company, was taken into United States Federal custody to face felony charges of conducting unlicensed money transactions and the murder of his wife. Shortly thereafter, the website ceased to be available. As a consequence of these charges, by January 2010 the U.S. Government had seized all of the assets of e-Bullion, resulting in the complete closure of the company. In June 2011 a California jury found Fayed guilty of murder and sentenced him to death.

==== Pecunix ====
Pecunix was a gold based digital currency (or e-currency) in which accounts had balances in GAU (gold grams).

Pecunix was founded by Simon "Sidd" Davis in 2002, and was registered and incorporated in Panama. All gold bullion was originally stored with Mat Securitas Express AG in Zürich, Switzerland, but in 2008 the Pecunix directors transferred the bullion to an undisclosed location.

In a 2012 interview with DGC Magazine, Mr. Davis described the development of the Voucher-Safe software and peer-to-peer network for the exchange of digital currencies. In early 2014, Pecunix announced they would be replacing their Pecunix Payments system with the open source Voucher-Safe system and PX-Gold. By the end of 2014, all legitimate digital currency exchangers had ceased dealing with Pecunix. In early 2015, Pecunix disabled the log-in feature of their website, thereby preventing all users from accessing their accounts. A statement on the Pecunix website claimed that this was a temporary change "due to new management and restructuring", but access was never restored. The P2P Voucher Payment System became fully operational in August 2015, but PX-Gold never came into existence. Account holders never recovered their funds.

=== Data security ===
Digital gold systems are completely dependent on electronic storage and transmission of account ownership information. Therefore, the security of a given digital currency account is dependent upon the security of the issuer as well as the security of the accountholder's computer.

While the digital gold issuers employ data security experts to protect their systems, the average accountholder's computer is poorly protected against malware (trojans, worms and viruses) that can be used to intercept information used to access the user's DGC account. Therefore, the most common attacks on digital currency systems are directed against accountholders' computers by the use of malicious spam, phishing and other methods.

Issuers have taken quite different approaches to this problem. E-gold basically places the entire responsibility on the user, and employs a user-name and password authentication system that is weak and highly vulnerable to interception by malware. (Though it is the most common authentication method used by online banks.) The "not our problem" approach to user security has negatively contributed to e-gold's public image, as not a few e-gold accounts have been hacked and swept clean by attackers..

e-Bullion offers account holders a "Cryptocard" security token that changes the passphrase with each logon, but charges the account holder US$99.50 for the token. E-bullion does not require customers to use the Cryptocard, so account holders who choose not to get one may suffer from the same security issues as e-gold customers.

Pecunix devised a unique rotating key system that provides many of the benefits of a security token without requiring the user to buy one. Pecunix also supported the use of PGP signatures to access an account, which is probably the strongest of all authentication methods.

=== Exchange risk ===
Digital gold currency is a form of representative money as it directly represents gold metal on deposit or in custody. This depends on the issuer. Most issuers have the gold on deposit - i.e., the issuer will redeem the digital currency obligation with physical metal. Just as the exchange rates of national currencies fluctuate against each other, the exchange rates of DGCs fluctuate against national currencies, which is reflected by the price of gold in a particular currency. This creates exchange risk for any account holder, in the same way one would experience exchange risk by holding a bank account in a foreign currency.

Some DGC holders make use of the digital currency for daily monetary transactions, even though most of their normal income and expenses are denominated in the national currency of their home country. Fluctuations in the value of gold against their national currency can create some confusion and difficulty for new users as they see the "value" of their DGC account fluctuate in terms of their native currency.

In contrast to exchange risk, caused by gold's fluctuation against national currency, the purchasing power of gold (and therefore DGCs) is measured by its fluctuation against other commodities, goods and services. Since gold has historically been the refuge of choice in times of inflation or economic hardship, the purchasing power of gold becomes stronger during times of negative sentiment in the markets. Due to this speculative interference, there are times when purchasing power has also declined. For example, in 2007–2008, gold volatility closely tracked the run-up in oil prices.

== Providers ==
Comparison of operating DGCs:

Digital gold currency	Introduced	Phased out	Financially regulated	GDCA member	Bullion stored	Bullion audit trail	Number of user accounts	DCE transfers accepted	Wire transfers accepted	Annual storage fee	Processing fee (when receiving from another user)
e-dinar	2000		✗	✗	Undisclosed	✗	Undisclosed	✗	✓	1%	1% (with max. 0.015 gold dinar)
Pecunix	2002	2015	✗	✓	2,777 oz gold	✓	Undisclosed	✓	✗	0%	0.15 - 0.50% (with min. 0.0001 - max. 3.0 gold grams)
iGolder	2005	2013	✗	✗	Undisclosed	✗	Undisclosed	✗	✓	x%	1%
Liberty Reserve	2004	2013	✗	✗	Undisclosed	✗	Undisclosed	✗	✗	x%	1%
gbullion	2007		✗	✗	Undisclosed	✗	Undisclosed	✗	✗	x%	1%
e-gold	1996	2008	✗	✗	Undisclosed	✓	over 1.6 million funded accounts in May 2007	✓	✗	1% per annum	Depended on amount spent
eCache	~2007	<2014									
Gold Bullion International LLC	2014		✗	✗	Undisclosed	✓	Undisclosed	✓	✓	0%	30bit/s Ripple (payment protocol)
Global Standard Gold (AUG)	2015		✓	✗	Undisclosed	Undisclosed	Undisclosed	✓	✗	Depends on balance	Depends on amount spent
GoldMoney / BitGold	2015		✓		20,799,464.939 grams Mar. 2017	✓	1,425,254 March 2016		✓	0% personal	0.5% personal accounts / 1% business

== Criticisms ==
DGC providers and exchangers have been accused of being a medium for fraudulent high-yield investment program (HYIP) schemes. In January 2006, BusinessWeek reported that ShadowCrew, an online gang, used the e-gold system in a massive identity theft and fraud scheme. Traditional banks are also used frequently for such fraud. Allegations that e-gold is a safe medium for crime and fraud are strongly denied by its chairman and founder, Dr. Douglas Jackson. Further, it can be argued that such problems lay with the source of the information or monies, rather than the location of storage of such ill-gotten gains. In other words, it would be difficult to claim the bank as villain when the criminal activity occurred by other parties away from the storage location.

Many DGC providers do not disclose the amount of bullion stored (see table), or do not allow independent external bullion audits, raising concerns that such companies do not maintain a 100% reserve ratio, or that their currency is entirely virtual and not backed by physical gold at all.

Due to increase of compliance requirements for payment service providers, Jersey-based GoldMoney decided to suspend its DGC service as from 21 January 2012

== Cultural references ==
- The novel Alongside Night by J. Neil Schulman features several types of competing DGCs.
- The novel Cryptonomicon by Neal Stephenson uses the idea of a gold-based digital currency in combination with strong cryptography.
- The novel Minerva by Robert P. Murphy features DGCs prominently.
- The novel Molon Labe! by Kenneth W. Royce features a gold based digital accounting system very similar to DGCs.
- The novel The Cryptographer by Tobias Hill is centered around Soft Gold, a DGC.
- The novel The Way to Freedom by Carl Kyler is about gold money and digital gold currencies.

== See also ==
- Bitcoin
- Cryptocurrency
- Full-reserve banking
- Goldback
- Gold exchange-traded fund
- Gold exchange-traded product
- Gold standard
- Gold to Go (Automated banking machine)
- Vaulted gold
- Vera Valor
