= DBLCI Optimum Yield Index =

DBLCI Optimum Yield Index (DBLCI-OY) is a commodity price index operated by German Deutsche Bank. It is similar to the Deutsche Bank Liquid Commodity Index but has more commodities from more sectors. The DBLCI-OY indices are available for 24 commodities drawn from the energy, precious metals, industrial metals, agricultural and livestock sectors. A DBLCI-OY index based on the DBLCI benchmark weights is also available and the optimum yield technology has also been applied to the energy, precious metals, industrial metals and agricultural sector indices.

Like the DBLCI, the DBLCI-OY is available in USD, EUR, GBP and JPY on a hedged and un-hedge basis. The DBLCI-OY is rebalanced on the fifth index business day of November when each commodity is adjusted to its base weight. The DBLCI-OY is also listed as an exchange-traded fund (ETF) on the American Stock Exchange.

== History ==
In May 2006, Deutsche Bank launched a new set of commodity index products called the Deutsche Bank Liquid Commodities Indices Optimum Yield, or DBLCI-OY.

== Methodology ==
The rationale of the Optimum Yield technology was to address the dynamic nature of commodity forward curves. Unstable forward curves has meant the traditional approach employed by commodity indices, namely rolling futures contracts on a predefined scheduled (e.g. monthly) has, in our view, become an inferior strategy for passive commodity index investing. The DBLCI-OY indices are designed to select the futures contacts that either maximise the positive roll yield in backwardation term structures or minimise the negative roll yield in contangoed markets from the list of tradeable futures that expire in the next 13 months.

The changing pattern in commodity term structures has important implications for commodity index investing. Historically the engine room of performance within a commodity index has derived from the positive roll return generated in the energy sector due to the tendency for forward curves in this part of the commodity complex to be downward sloping or backward dated. However, the appearance of contango in the crude oil term structure over the past three years has meant the benefits of a positive roll return have disappeared and have been replaced by a negative roll return.

== Characteristics ==
- Six commodities: WTI crude oil, heating oil, aluminium, gold, corn and wheat.
- Index rolls to the futures contract that generates the maximum implied roll return from the list of tradable futures that expire in the next 14 months.
- Commodity weights are re-balanced annually.
- The DBLCI-OY is listed as an Exchange Traded Fund on the American Stock Exchange
- Total and excess returns data are available from December 2, 1988.

== Components and base weights ==
	Index Weight	Contract Months	Exchange
Energy			
WTI Crude Oil	35.00%	Jan-Dec	NYMEX
Heating Oil	20.00%	Jan-Dec	NYMEX
Precious Metals			
Gold	10.00%	Dec	COMEX
Industrial Metals			
Aluminium	12.50%	Dec	LME
Grains			
Corn	11.25%	Dec	CBOT
Wheat	11.25%	Dec	CBOT

== See also ==
- DBLCI Mean Reversion Index
- DBLCI Optimum Yield Balanced Index
- Dow Jones–AIG Commodity Index
- Reuters-CRB Index
- Rogers International Commodity Index
- Standard & Poor's Commodity Index
