= DBLCI Optimum Yield Balanced Index =

DBLCI optimum yield balanced index (DBLCI-OY) is a commodity price index operated by German based Deutsche Bank that is based on the Deutsche Bank Liquid Commodity Index but with reduced energy sector weighting. The DBLCI-OY Balanced has the same underlying 14 commodities as the DBLCI-OY Broad, but, the energy sector weight is reduced from 55% of the broad index to 35%. The DBLCI-OY Balanced is designed to be UCITS III compliant, that is the weight of no single commodity or strongly correlated securities exceed 35%. The DBLCI-OY Balanced is listed as an Exchange-traded fund (ETF) on the Deutsche Börse.

In terms of sector weights, the DBLCI-OY Balanced is broadly similar to the S&P GSCI Light Energy Index and the Bloomberg Commodity Index although the DBLCI-OY Broad has no exposure to the livestock sector, but, instead has a higher allocation to precious metals.

== Characteristics ==
- Consists of 14 commodities drawn from the energy, precious metals, industrial metals and agriculture sectors.
- Index rolling mechanism is based on DB’s Optimum Yield technology.
- UCITS III compliant.
- Maximum sector allocation is limited to 35%.

== See also ==
- DBLCI Optimum Yield Index
- DBLCI Mean Reversion Index
- Dow Jones–AIG Commodity Index
- Reuters-CRB Index
- Rogers International Commodity Index
- Standard & Poor's Commodity Index
