= Deutsche Bank Liquid Commodity Index =

The Deutsche Bank Liquid Commodity Index (DBLCI) is a commodity price index operated by German based Deutsche Bank. It was launched in February 2003 and tracks the performance of six commodities in the energy, precious metals, industrial metals and grain sectors. The DBLCI has constant weightings for each of the six commodities and the index is rebalanced annually in the first week of November. Consequently, the weights fluctuate during the year according to the price movement of the underlying commodity futures.

== Methodology ==
Energy contracts are rolled monthly, all other commodity futures contracts are rolled annually. This rolling procedure was adopted given the historical tendency for energy curves to be in backwardation and metal and agricultural forward curves to be in contango. Futures contracts rolling takes place between the second and sixth business day of the month. The DBLCI is quoted in both total returns and excess returns terms in US dollars as well as a variety of major currencies.

== Characteristics ==
- Six commodities: WTI crude oil, heating oil, aluminium, gold, corn and wheat.
- Constant weighting which reflect world production and inventory, providing a diverse and balanced commodity exposure.
- A rule-based and transparent calculation methodology. Energy contracts are rolled monthly, metal and grain contracts annually.
- Total and excess returns data are available from December 1, 1988.

== Features ==
Two of the main distinguishing features between the DBLCI and other commodity indices relate to the number of components and the overall allocation to the energy complex. While the number of commodities in the S&P Goldman Sachs Commodity Index, Dow Jones-AIG and the Reuters-Jeffries/CRB index are broadly similar ranging from 19 to 24 commodities, the DBLCI has just six commodities. The allocation to energy also differs substantially ranging from 70% in the S&P GSCI, 55% in the DBLCI, 39% in the RJ/CRB and 33% in the Dow Jones-AIG.

A lower number of commodities in an index can offer certain advantages. For example, it involves an investor in only the most liquid commodity contracts in their respective sectors. Last year, aluminium accounted for 46% of combined turnover on the LME. Consequently, a commodity index which has part of its basket in lead or nickel would entail greater liquidity risk since these two metals constitute only 11% of total turnover on the LME. Energy markets exhibit a similar degree of market concentration with the benchmark West Texas Intermediate (WTI) crude oil contract representing 37% of total energy futures turnover on NYMEX in 2006.

== Components and base weights ==
| | Index Weight | Contract Months | Exchange |
|---|---|---|---|
| Energy | | | |
| WTI Crude Oil | 35.00% | Jan-Dec | NYMEX |
| Heating Oil | 20.00% | Jan-Dec | NYMEX |
| Precious Metals | | | |
| Gold | 10.00% | Dec | COMEX |
| Industrial Metals | | | |
| Aluminium | 12.50% | Dec | LME |
| Grains | | | |
| Corn | 11.25% | Dec | CBOT |
| Wheat | 11.25% | Dec | CBOT |

== See also ==
- DBLCI Optimum Yield Index
- DBLCI Mean Reversion Index
- DBLCI Optimum Yield Balanced Index
- Dow Jones-UBS Commodity Index
- Rogers International Commodity Index
- Standard & Poor's Commodity Index
- Thomson Reuters/Jefferies CRB Index
