= DBLCI Mean Reversion Index =

The DBLCI Mean Reversion Index is a commodity index published by the Deutsche Bank. Launched at the same time as the Deutsche Bank Liquid Commodity Index (DBLCI) in February 2003, the DBLCI-Mean Reversion has the same underlying assets. The listed instruments are also rolled using the same mechanism as the DBLCI, namely energy contracts are rolled monthly and the metal and grain contracts are rolled annually. This occurs between the second and sixth business day of the month. The DBLCI-MR is also quoted in both total returns and excess returns terms in US dollars as well as EUR, JPY and GBP.

== Rolling methodology ==
In contrast to the DBLCI, the DBLCI-MR undertakes no annual re-balancing. Instead, the individual commodity weights are reset every time any one of the commodities undergoes a 'trigger event'. This happens when the one-year moving average of the commodity price is a whole multiple of 5% away from the five-year moving average. When this happens, the weights of all the commodities are re-balanced such that 'expensive' commodities have their weights reduced while 'cheap' commodities have their weights increased according to a simple, pre-defined formula. The entire process is rule-based and mandatory. The fact that there exist clear pre-set 'hurdle rates' to trigger a re-weighting, minimises the number of re-weightings and thus reduces the transactions costs for replication.

== Characteristics ==
- Six commodities: WTI crude oil, heating oil, aluminium, gold, corn and wheat. The same rolling schedule as the DBLCI.
- No annual rebalancing. Instead commodity weights are adjusted according to a pre-defined formula.
- It is the only commodity index in the marketplace which possesses a dynamic rule-based asset allocation mechanism which attempts to underweight "expensive commodities and overweight "cheap" commodities.
- Total and excess returns data are available from December 1, 1988.

== Rationale and mechanism ==
The DBLCI-Mean Reversion is the only index which dynamically changes its weights according to whether a commodity is considered cheap or expensive. When all the commodities are within 5% of their five-year averages, the weights will automatically revert to the weights of the base index, the DBLCI. The rationale behind the construction of the DBCLI-MR is to exploit the tendency of commodity prices to trade within wide, but, defined ranges because:

- As prices of commodities rise, new production capacity is brought on line to benefit from higher prices.
- More supply becomes available from alternative sources previously considered uneconomic.
- In oil markets, quota systems that attempt to control supply come under strain as the rewards for cheating rise.
- As prices rise, the demand for the commodity will begin to fall as it faces competition from cheaper sources.

The net effect is to keep commodity prices bound around their long run average price.

In essence the DBLCI-MR is a strategy to buy low and sell high. It therefore tends to take profits gradually in a bull run and re-invest those proceeds into cheaper commodities. One benefit of this approach is that the DBLCI-MR tends to extract volatility from the index since as commodity prices rally so to does volatility. evidence suggests that portfolios comprising past losers tend to outperform past winners and vice versa over time, see Hersh Shefrin, Beyond Greed and Fear, Harvard Business School, 2000. In fact this has been a recurring theme of commodity markets over the past few years. We find that it has been common for a commodity to be at the bottom of the league table in terms of total returns in one year, to be close to the top in the following year only to reverse these gains in the next 12 month period.

== See also ==
- DBLCI Optimum Yield Index
- DBLCI Optimum Yield Balanced Index
- Dow Jones–AIG Commodity Index
- Reuters-CRB Index
- Rogers International Commodity Index
- Standard & Poor's Commodity Index
