= AIG Financial Products =

Defunct subsidiary of the American International Group

- Type: Subsidiary
- Industry: Financial services
- Founded: 1987
- Founder: Howard Sosin
- Defunct: 2022
- Fate: Bankrupt
- Headquarters: Wilton, Connecticut, United States
- Products: OTC derivative
- Parent: American International Group

AIG Financial Products Corporation (AIGFP) was a subsidiary of the American International Group, headquartered in New York, New York, with major operations in London. The collapse of AIG Financial Products, headquartered in Wilton, Connecticut, is considered to have played a pivotal role in the 2008 financial crisis.

In spring 2008, AIGFP suffered enormous losses from credit default swaps that it issued and traded in earlier years. Company officials issued the swaps believing they would have to pay out few, if any, of them. But as the 2008 financial crisis worsened, many companies began to default on their debt, forcing AIGFP to assume losses far greater than anticipated.

The losses at AIGFP caused credit agencies to downgrade the credit rating of the entire AIG corporation in September 2008. The resulting liquidity crisis essentially bankrupted all of AIG. Many believed that AIG was too big to fail and that an AIG bankruptcy could cause an already fragile financial system to collapse, prompting the Federal Reserve Bank to extend an $85 billion line of credit to AIG. As a result, the Federal Reserve was issued a stock warrant for 79.9% of the equity in AIG, effectively nationalizing the world's largest insurer. Shortly after, U.S. Treasury Secretary Henry Paulson announced the treasury's desire to break up and liquidate most of AIG. The company has since sold off many of its subsidiaries to raise the cash to repay the Federal Reserve. AIG closed AIGFP in December 2022, and the subsidiary filed for Chapter 11 bankruptcy shortly after.

== History ==
Howard Sosin started the group in 1987. AIGFP businesses specialize interest rate and currency swaps and, more broadly, the capital markets.

AIGFP focused principally on OTC derivatives markets and acted as principal in nearly all of its transactions involving capital markets offerings and corporate finance, investment and financial risk management products. AIGFP played key roles in the acquisition of London City Airport and, in one of the largest private equity transactions announced in 2006, the management-led buyout of Kinder Morgan.

AIGFP's commodity derivatives and commodity indices helped stimulate the development of this new asset class. AIGFP's sponsored a major study on the historical performance of commodity futures by professors Gary Gorton and K. Geert Rouwenhorst. AIGFP created a specialized credit business. AIGFP focused its business on structured products like CDO's. In 2003, it absorbed subsidiary, AIG Trading Group (AIG-TG) which dealt primarily in over the counter derivatives and created the Dow Jones-AIG Commodity Index (DJ-AIGCI) from their offices in Greenwich, CT. At that point, the Market and Credit Risk management groups were reduced in size. The DJ-AIGCI is a leading commodity benchmark composed of 19 futures contracts on physical commodities. As of the end of June 2007, there was an estimated $38 billion invested in financial products that track the DJ-AIGCI on a global basis.

From 1987 to 2004, AIGFP contributed over $5 billion to AIG’s pre-tax income. During that period, AIG's market capitalization increased from $11 billion to $181 billion, and its stock price increased from $4.50 per share to $62.34 per share.

== Crisis of 2008 ==
AIGFP's trading in credit derivatives led to enormous losses. These losses at AIGFP division essentially bankrupted the entire AIG operation, and forced the United States government to bail out the insurer. Under CEO Edward Liddy, the decision was made to unwind AIG Financial Product's entire book of business. Gerry Pasciucco, a vice chairman at Morgan Stanley, who was not involved with AIG FP when it made its catastrophic bets, was selected to manage the unwinding of the portfolio in October 2008, after the company had effectively failed and been taken over by the Federal Reserve.

The story of AIGFP losses is substantially profiled in the book The Big Short by Michael Lewis.
