= Goldman roll =

The Goldman roll is the monthly sale and purchase of commodities for the Goldman Sachs Commodity Index (S&P-GSCI).

While a stock market index is a purely mathematical construct, a commodity index requires entering a long position or ownership of a physical product through a futures exchange. These contracts must be released and renewed, typically monthly. This roll yield both creates and requires arbitrage opportunities which are statistically significant, measuring a Sharpe ratio as high as 4.4 between 2000 and 2010.

As the S&P-GSCI was the first commodity index and remains popular, the rollover of its futures was analyzed and described as the Goldman roll.

Yiqun Mou's analysis of the Goldman roll indicates up to $26 billion was made through arbitrage of the Goldman roll between 2000 and 2009. Matt Taibbi, describing the Goldman roll, said "there are lots of folks who believe that knowing when and how it works gives investors an unfair advantage (particularly Goldman)—but in the interest of not having the reader’s head explode, we’ll skip that topic for now."
