= LME Zinc =

Futures contracts

LME Zinc is a group of spot, forward, and futures contracts traded on the London Metal Exchange (LME) for the delivery of zinc. The zinc, which is of 99.9% purity, can be used for pre-sale handling and physical delivery of sales or purchases, and investments. Producers, semi-fabricators, consumers, recyclers, and merchants can use zinc futures contracts to hedge zinc price risks and to reference prices.

As of December 31, 2019, LME Zinc contracts were associated with 51,200 metric tons of physical zinc stored in LME-approved warehouses worldwide, representing around 0.4% of the 2019 world zinc production of 13 million metric tons. Their prices act as reference prices for physical global zinc transactions.

== Contract description ==
LME Zinc contracts trade on the London Metal Exchange. The contracts require physical delivery of zinc for settlement, and the deliverable assets for the contracts are 25 tonnes of high-grade primary zinc. Contract prices are quoted in US dollars ($) per ton. LME prices have minimum tick sizes of $0.50 per ton (or $12.50 for one contract) for open outcry trading in the LME Ring and electronic trading on LME Select, while minimum tick sizes for inter-office telephone trading are $0.01 per ton (or $0.50 for one contract). Carry transactions involving zinc futures also use minimum tick sizes of $0.01 per ton. Contracts are organized along LME's prompt date (or delivery date) structure.

=== Contract Date structure ===
LME offers three groups of LME Zinc contracts with daily, weekly, and monthly delivery dates. Trades can be placed on contracts with daily settlement dates from two days to three months in the future. Contracts settled weekly are available for trading three to six months in the future. Trades can also be placed on contracts with monthly settlement dates from six months to 123 months in the future.

== Price discovery ==
LME Zinc futures contract prices serve as a platform for zinc price discovery. Futures markets are seen as more publicly visible and accessible, due to lower transaction costs, for a greater number of buyers and sellers than the cash market. More buyers and sellers in the futures market can allow market participants to incorporate further demand and supply information into futures price compared with the cash price. Empirical tests have shown that LME Zinc spot and futures markets are closely linked, although the spot market sometimes serves as a source of price discovery for the LME Zinc futures market rather than the reverse.

== As a financial asset ==
LME Zinc futures prices are also a part of both the Bloomberg Commodity Index and the S&P GSCI commodity index, which are benchmark indices widely followed in financial markets by traders and institutional investors. Its weighting in these commodity indices gives LME Zinc prices non-trivial influence on returns of investment funds and portfolios.

=== Related derivatives ===
LME also offers other derivatives related to primary zinc, including options, TAPOs, Monthly Average Futures, and LME-minis.

Zinc contracts are also available for trading on the Chicago Mercantile Exchange (CME). The CME Zinc futures contract is for 25 metric tons of primary zinc, and prices are quoted in US dollars per ton; 12 consecutive monthly CME Zinc contracts are available for trading.

Financial market conventions and empirical studies have grouped Nickel futures contracts with other base metals futures contracts together as an asset class or a sub-asset class. The Base Metals grouping usually includes futures contracts on aluminum (sometimes including aluminum alloy contracts), copper, lead, nickel, tin, and zinc. These are also sometimes called Industrial Metals, Non-ferrous Metals, and Non-precious Metals. All of the metals in this group have associated LME contracts available for trading.
