= LME Nickel =

Contracts on the London Metal Exchange

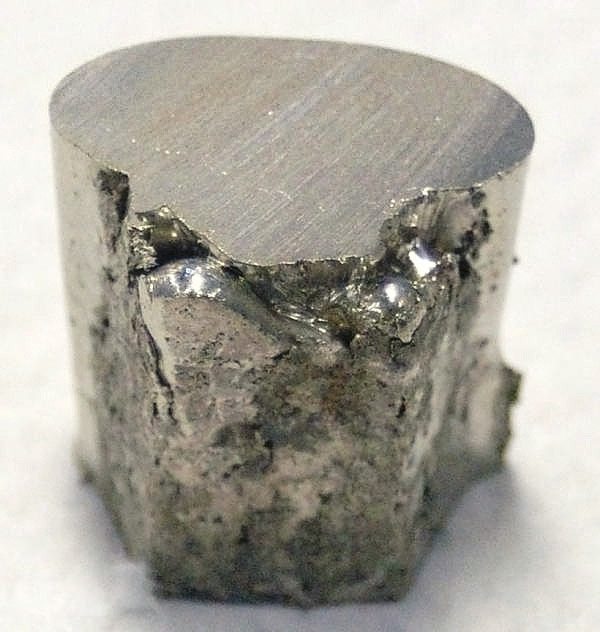
A piece of nickel, about 3 centimetres in size.

LME Nickel refers to the spot, forward, and futures contracts, trading on the London Metal Exchange (LME) for primary nickel. These contracts are used for price hedging, physical delivery, investment, and speculation. Nickel futures contracts are used to hedge price risks and as a reference for prices. As of late 2024, LME nickel contracts were linked to approximately 230,000 tonnes of physical nickel held in about 465 LME-approved warehouses worldwide. This represents 6.50% of the estimated global mined nickel production of 3.52 million tones in 2024.

Despite the low share of physical nickel associated with LME nickel contracts, global physical Nickel transactions are usually based on LME nickel prices. This practice began in the 1970s and continued until 1982, when producer nickel prices, especially Canadian producer prices, collapsed and the industry switched to LME prices.

== History ==
From World War One to the late 1970s, world nickel prices were set by producer price lists. Three main suppliers, INCO, Falconbridge, and Société Le Nickel, produced around 75% of world nickel demand and controlled pricing.

=== Development of L.M.E. Nickel prices as benchmark prices ===
In the 1970s, large producers lost pricing power due to three main factors. First, technological development of AOD processes and Laterite ore processing led to the new nickel producers entering the market. Second, a 1969 strike in Canada, and subsequent strikes, led to nickel shortages and price spikes, which caused some nickel buyers to lose faith in producer list pricing. Third, market participants started to realize that producer list pricing worked only when demand is high and producers' stocks were low; when demand weakened, producers were forced to discount from official producer list prices to secure orders. Producer price lists became less relevant throughout the 1970s, and physical nickel trades gradually adopted LME nickel prices as benchmark prices thereafter.

=== 2022 suspension of nickel trading by the L.M.E. ===
On 8 March 2022, the LME suspended trading in all nickel contracts and canceled trades executed on or after midnight local time. The market reopened on 16 March, only to shut down again when it quickly hit the price decline limit of 5%. It hit the expanded limit of 8% on 17 March, shutting down again for the day, and the larger expanded limit of 12% price decline on 18 March. The turmoil began two weeks after the Russian invasion of Ukraine and some see Russia's large nickel exports as a related cause. Other causes were related to a large short interest in nickel. In the several months leading to March 2022, Xiang Guangda began taking a large short position in nickel through Tsingshan Group to hedge against falling prices. Due to a rise in nickel prices by early March, Xiang was forced to purchase nickel contracts at the LME, creating a short squeeze. The price of nickel at the exchange increased by more than 100%, reaching over US$100,000 per ton before LME trading was suspended. By the time trading had been suspended, Tsingshan had suffered US$8 billion in losses on paper.

Since traders cannot exit their long positions in nickel with the LME shut down, some analysts have pointed out that this, while legal, has created "another example of a breach of social contract between the exchanges and investors, and further widens the gap between trust and mistrust."

In the years following the suspension, the LME faced regulatory and legal scrutiny over its handling of the nickel market disruption. In 2023 and 2025, UK courts and regulators reviewed the exchange's actions, ultimately upholding the LME's authority to cancel trades while also identifying shortcomings in its market controls during periods of extreme volatility.

== Contract description ==
LME nickel contracts trade on the London Metal Exchange, which introduced them in 1979. The contracts require physical delivery of the asset for settlement, and deliverable assets for the contracts are 6 tonnes of nickel of 99.80% purity (minimum) conforming to B39-79 (2008). The contract prices are quoted in US dollars per tonne but can also be settled or cleared in Japanese Yen, UK Sterling, and the Euro. LME nickel prices have minimum tick sizes of $5.00 per tonne (or $30.00 for one contract) for open outcry trading in the LME Ring and electronic trading on LME Select, while minimum tick sizes are reduced for inter-office telephone trading to $0.01 per tonne (or $0.50 for one contract). Carry trades involving nickel futures also have reduced minimum tick sizes at $0.01 per tonne. Contracts are organized along L.M.E.'s prompt date (or delivery date) structure.

=== Prompt date structure ===
L.M.E. offers three groups of L.M.E. nickel contracts with daily, weekly, and monthly delivery dates. Contracts with daily settlement dates are available from two days to three months in the future, which means that on 2020-05-12, contracts with daily delivery dates for 2020-05-14 to 2020-08-12 are available for trading. Contracts with weekly settlement dates are available from three months to six months in the future, which means that on 2020-05-12, contracts with weekly delivery dates for 2020-08-12 to 2020-11-25 are available for trading. Contracts with monthly settlement dates are available from six months to 63 months in the future, which means that on 2020-05-12, contracts with monthly delivery dates for 2020-05-20 to 2025-08-21 are available for trading.

== Non-commercial uses ==
LME nickel futures contract prices serves as a platform for nickel price discovery because futures markets are more publicly visible and more accessible, due to lower transaction costs, for a larger number of buyers and sellers than the cash market. A larger number of buyers and sellers in the futures market allows those market participants to incorporate more demand and supply information into the futures price compared with the cash price. Empirical tests have shown that LME nickel spot and futures markets are closely linked, although sometimes the spot market serves as a source of price discovery for the LME nickel futures market rather than the reverse.

LME nickel contracts with delivery dates up to 63 months into the future are available, and prices of those contracts can produce forecasts of the spot price of nickel at those delivery times. However, LME nickel price forecasts of spot nickel prices were found to exhibit biases.

LME nickel futures prices are also a part of both the Bloomberg Commodity Index and the S&P GSCI commodity index, which are benchmark indices widely followed in financial markets by traders and institutional investors. Its weighting in these commodity indices give LME nickel prices non-trivial influence on returns on a wide range of investment funds and portfolios.

== Related derivatives ==
LME also offers other derivatives related to LME nickel futures contracts, such as Options, TAPOs, Monthly Average Futures, LMEminis, and TAS contracts.

The Shanghai Futures Exchange (SHFE) offers nickel futures contracts for trading as well, SHFE contracts are for 1 metric ton of nickel Cathode as prescribed in the National Standard of GB/T 6516-2010 Ni9996, with the total content of nickel and cobalt > 99.96%. SHFE nickel contract prices are quoted in Yuan per ton.

Financial market conventions and empirical studies have grouped nickel futures contracts with other base metals futures contracts together as an asset class or a sub-asset class. The Base Metals grouping usually includes futures contracts on aluminum (sometimes including aluminum alloy contracts), copper, lead, nickel, tin, and zinc, and they are also sometimes called industrial metals, non-ferrous metals, and non-precious metals. All of the metals in this group have associated LME contracts available for trading.

== Pricing factors ==
Warehouse stock levels, or amounts, movement, and distribution of physical nickel stored in both LME approved and non-approved warehouses, affects LME nickel pricing. Nickel stocks in LME-approved warehouses are relatively transparent, while nickel stocks at non-LME approved warehouses can be hidden or difficult to interpret. Relatively low warehouse stocks can signal lack of supply or extra demand for nickel and drive up nickel prices. While low warehouse stocks can signal abundant supply or low demand for nickel and drive down prices. Nickel warehouse stocks in regions that historically consume high levels of nickel matter more in supply and demand terms than stocks in regions that historically consume low levels of nickel, and thus have higher impact on nickel pricing. LME warehouses are chosen worldwide to be close to sources of demand rather than supply, ensuring that the buyer has immediate access to metals they purchased on the LME. However, China does not allow warehouses in its territory to become LME-registered, and metal for Chinese delivery is typically shipped from Singapore or South Korea. Inventory figures across all warehouses are published daily by the LME.
