= Sosin =

Sosin (Russian: Сосин) is a Russian masculine surname, its feminine counterpart is Sosina. It may refer to

- Howard Sosin, American businessman
- Łukasz Sosin (born 1977), Polish football striker
- Olga Sosina (born 1992), Russian ice hockey forward
