= Aluminium futures on the London Metal Exchange =

Aluminium futures contracts traded on the London Metal Exchange

Aluminium futures on the London Metal Exchange are exchange-traded contracts listed by the London Metal Exchange (LME) for the delivery of primary aluminium. The main LME aluminium contract is a physically settled futures contract used by producers, fabricators, consumers, recyclers, merchants and financial participants for price hedging, physical delivery, trading and speculation. LME aluminium prices are also used as reference prices in physical aluminium supply contracts and commodity indices.

The contract was first listed in 1978 as one of the LME's non-ferrous metals contracts. Aluminium held in LME-approved warehouses became the subject of controversy in the early 2010s, when long warehouse queues and rising regional delivery premiums led to litigation and regulatory scrutiny.

In 2019, aluminium stocks held in LME-registered warehouses were approximately 1.5 million tonnes. Global primary aluminium production that year was about 63.7 million tonnes, meaning that LME-registered warehouse inventories represented approximately 2.3% of annual global output.

== Contract description ==
The primary LME aluminium futures contract is a physically settled contract for high-grade primary aluminium. It has a lot size of 25 tonnes, and prices are quoted in US dollars per tonne.

The contract is traded through the LME's open-outcry Ring, its LMEselect electronic trading platform, and the inter-office telephone market. The minimum price fluctuation, or tick size, is $0.50 per tonne for outright trades on the Ring and LMEselect, and $0.01 per tonne for inter-office outright trades. Carry trades, which involve positions for different prompt dates, have a minimum tick size of $0.01 per tonne across all three venues.

LME aluminium uses the exchange's prompt-date structure. The contract has daily prompt dates out to three months, weekly prompt dates from the third to the sixth month, and monthly prompt dates from the seventh to the 123rd month.

== Reference pricing and index use ==
LME aluminium prices are used outside exchange trading as reference prices for physical aluminium contracts. The LME describes its Official Price as a reference price for physical contracts, and its Official Settlement Price as the price at which LME futures are settled. The exchange also describes price discovery as a core function of its market, with LME reference prices used for hedging, physical settlement and contract negotiations. An academic study of the aluminium market also identified a price-discovery role for LME aluminium futures.

LME aluminium is included in several commodity-index methodologies. The Bloomberg Commodity Index includes aluminium and uses high-grade primary aluminium traded on the LME as its designated aluminium contract. The S&P GSCI methodology also lists LME aluminium among the contracts used in its commodity-index calculations. As a result, movements in LME aluminium prices can affect aluminium subindices and index-linked commodity investment products.

== Related and comparable contracts ==
In addition to its primary aluminium futures contract, the LME offers aluminium-related derivatives including options, trade-at-settlement contracts, traded average price options (TAPOs), monthly average futures, HKEX-London Minis and LMEminis. TAPOs are financially settled Asian options whose payoff depends on the Monthly Average Settlement Price for the relevant contract month.

The LME also lists related aluminium and aluminium-input contracts, including LME Aluminium Alloy, LME NASAAC, LME Aluminium Premiums, LME Alumina (Platts), and LME Aluminium UBC Scrap US (Argus).

Aluminium futures are also traded on other exchanges. The CME Group aluminium futures contract has a contract unit of 25 metric tonnes, with prices quoted in US dollars and cents per metric tonne. CME lists monthly aluminium futures contracts for 60 consecutive months.

The Shanghai Futures Exchange (SHFE) also lists aluminium futures. SHFE aluminium futures have a contract size of 5 metric tonnes per lot and are quoted in renminbi per metric tonne.

== Warehouse queues and litigation ==
Aluminium held in LME-approved warehouses became controversial in the early 2010s because of long warehouse load-out queues and higher regional delivery premiums.

In 2013, aluminium users filed a series of lawsuits in the United States alleging that financial institutions and LME-approved warehouse operators, including Goldman Sachs, JPMorgan Chase, Glencore and Metro International Trade Services, had restricted available aluminium supply by delaying the release of metal from warehouses. The plaintiffs alleged that longer queues increased regional premiums, which are delivery-related charges paid above the LME cash price for physical aluminium. The defendants denied the allegations.

The litigation had a complex procedural history. The LME was dismissed as a defendant in 2014 on sovereign-immunity grounds. In 2019, the United States Court of Appeals for the Second Circuit revived claims by direct purchasers of aluminium. In 2021, a United States district judge dismissed many of the remaining claims, while allowing claims by Reynolds Consumer Products and two other plaintiffs that had transacted directly with the defendants to proceed.

The controversy also drew scrutiny from the United States Senate Permanent Subcommittee on Investigations, which examined Wall Street banks' involvement in physical commodities, including aluminium warehousing. In 2014, the subcommittee said one focus of its investigation was Goldman's ownership of Metro and the management of Detroit-area LME warehouses. It reported that wait times to withdraw LME-warranted metal had increased from about 40 days to more than 600 days after Goldman acquired Metro.
