= AIG Emerging Market Foreign Exchange Indices =

AIG Emerging Market Foreign Exchange Indices^{SM} is a commodity price index.

The AIG Emerging Market Foreign Exchange Indices^{SM} are a family of investable index that reflect the return from going long on the underlying emerging market currencies via short-dated forward foreign exchange transactions. The AIG-EMFX (USD) or “Benchmark Index” reflects the total return from going long an equally weighted basket of 19 emerging market currencies versus USD. Regional indexes – again equally weighted – have been created for Asia, Central Europe, and Latin America. Indexes are re-weighted annually. AIG and the names of the AIG-EMFXI^{SM} indexes and sub-inventories or sub-indexes are trademarks or service marks of American International Group, Inc.

== See also ==
- Dow Jones-AIG Commodity Index
