= Jim Rogers =

American investor and writer (born 1942)

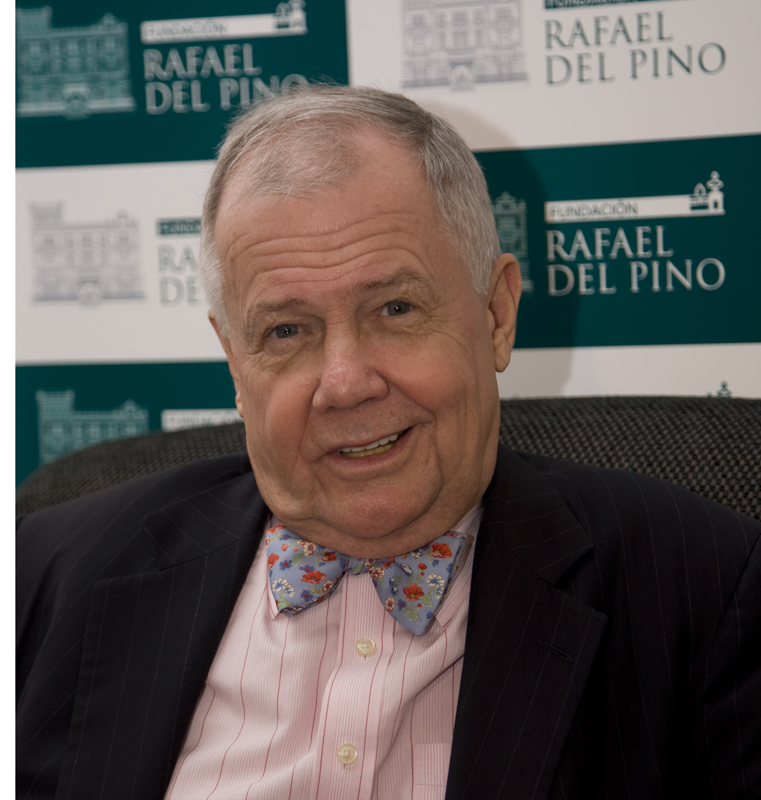
- Rogers in 2010
- Born: James Beeland Rogers Jr. October 19, 1942 (age 84); Baltimore, Maryland, U.S.
- Education: Balliol College, Oxford (BA); Yale University (BA)
- Occupations: Chairman of Beeland Interests; Co-founder of the Quantum Fund and Soros Fund Management
- Spouse(s): Lois Biener (m. 1966–69); Jennifer Skolnik (m. 1974–77) Paige Parker (m. 2000)
- Children: 2
- Website: jimrogers.com

James Beeland Rogers Jr. (born October 19, 1942) is an American investor and financial commentator based in Singapore. He is the chairman of Beeland Interests, Inc. He was the co-founder of the Quantum Fund and Soros Fund Management. He was also the creator of the Rogers International Commodities Index (RICI).

Rogers does not consider himself a member of any school of economic thought, but has acknowledged that his views best fit the label of the Austrian School of economics.

== Early life ==
Rogers was born in Baltimore, Maryland and raised in Demopolis, Alabama. In 1964, Rogers graduated with a bachelor's degree, cum laude, in history from Yale University. He got his first job on Wall Street, at Dominick & Dominick. In 1966, he acquired a second BA degree in philosophy, politics and economics from the University of Oxford, as a member of Balliol College.

== Business career ==
In 1964, Rogers joined Dominick & Dominick LLC on Wall Street, where he first learned about stocks and bonds. From 1966 to 1968, he was in the U.S. Army during the Vietnam War.

In 1970, Rogers joined investment bank Arnhold and S. Bleichroder, where he worked with George Soros.

In 1973, Soros and Rogers both left and founded the Quantum Fund. From 1973 to 1980, the portfolio gained 4,200% while the S&P advanced about 47%. The Quantum Fund was one of the first truly global funds.

In 1980, Rogers decided to "retire" and traveled on a motorcycle around the world. He has since been a guest professor of finance at the Columbia Business School.

In 1989 and 1990, Rogers was the moderator of WCBS' The Dreyfus Roundtable and FNN's The Profit Motive with Jim Rogers.

From 1990 to 1992, he traveled through China again and around the world on motorcycle, covering over 100,000 miles (160,000 km) across six continents. His journey was listed in the Guinness Book of World Records. He tells of his adventures and worldwide investments in the bestseller Investment Biker.

In 1998, Rogers founded the Rogers International Commodity Index. In 2007, the index and its three sub-indices were linked to exchange-traded notes under the banner ELEMENTS. The notes track the total return of the indices as an accessible way to invest in the index. Rogers is an outspoken advocate of agriculture investments.

Between January 1, 1999, and January 5, 2002, Rogers went on another Guinness-recognized journey through 116 countries, covering 245,000 kilometers with his wife Paige Parker in a custom-made Mercedes. The trip began in Iceland, which was about to celebrate the millennial anniversary of Leif Eriksson's first trip to America. On January 5, 2002, the couple returned to their New York home on Riverside Drive. He wrote Adventure Capitalist following this around-the-world adventure.

=== 2002 to present ===
On his return in 2002, Rogers became a regular guest on Fox News' Cavuto on Business and other financial TV shows. In 2005, he wrote Hot Commodities: How Anyone Can Invest Profitably in the World's Best Market, in which he quotes a Financial Analysts Journal academic paper co-authored by Yale School of Management professor Geert Rouwenhorst, entitled Facts and Fantasies about Commodity Futures.

In December 2007, Rogers sold his mansion in New York City for about $16 million and moved to Singapore. He said he moved because it was a groundbreaking time for investment potential in Asian markets. His daughters speak fluent Mandarin to prepare them for the future. He said, "If you were smart in 1807, you moved to London, if you were smart in 1907, you moved to New York City, and if you are smart in 2007, you move to Asia."

In a CNBC interview with Maria Bartiromo broadcast on May 5, 2008, Rogers said that people in China are extremely motivated and driven, and that he wants to be in that type of environment so his daughters are motivated and driven. He added that this is how America and Europe used to be. He chose not to move to Chinese cities like Hong Kong or Shanghai due to high pollution potentially causing health problems for his family. However, he remains skeptical of India's future, saying in 2001, "India as we know it will not survive another 30 or 40 years". In 2015, he exited the India market, saying, "One cannot invest based on hope".

In 2008, Rogers endorsed Ron Paul, a Republican congressman, for president of the United States.

In 2019, Rogers extolled the virtues of Sun Myung Moon's proposal for a Japan-Korea undersea tunnel, saying that it will open up Japan and Korea and bring the two countries together.

"... once it's open it brings new opportunities for travel, tourism, commerce -- for everything. A project like this… These things don't come along very often in history. We've had them before -- in England with the tunnel between Dover and France. But these things don't happen very often. This is a huge project. It will change geography and it will change history."

== Personal life ==
Rogers has been married three times. In 1966, he married his first wife, Lois Biener; they divorced in 1969. In 1974, he married Jennifer Skolnik; they divorced in 1977. He married Paige Parker in 2000; they have two daughters.

In 1977, Rogers bought a townhouse at 352 Riverside Drive in Manhattan, New York City; he resold it in 2008.

In September 2012, Rogers was appointed by VTB Capital as an advisor to the agricultural division of its global private equity unit. He noted: "Russia and the CIS region have all the ingredients needed to become the world's agriculture powerhouse. It seems that everything may now be coming together under VTB Capital to make this happen, so I am keen to participate, if the fund gets off the ground."

In February 2013, Rogers joined the board of advisors of the Coalition to Reduce Spending. In September 2015, he left the Indian market saying "one can't just invest on hope".

In April 2019, Rogers received an honorary Ph.D. from Pusan National University for his books containing positive messages on Korean reunification.

In 2025, Rogers funded and unveiled a newly commissioned statue of Dervorguilla of Galloway at Master's Fields, new Balliol College student accommodation.

== Financial advice ==
In 2002, Rogers said that Fed chairman Alan Greenspan's "reaction to the stock-market bubble has caused two more bubbles to grow: a real-estate bubble and a consumer-debt bubble." In 2006, Rogers said he was shorting US financials, home builders, and Fannie Mae.

On November 4, 2010, speaking at Balliol College, Oxford, Rogers urged students to scrap career plans for Wall Street or the city, London's financial district, and to study agriculture and mining instead. "The power is shifting again from the financial centers to the producers of real goods. The place to be is in commodities, raw materials, natural resources." He repeated this view in 2013 on The Bottom Line show on BBC Radio 4, in a feature on "Futurology for Business".

In May 2012, he remarked during an interview with Forbes magazine that "there's going to be a huge shift in American society, American culture, in the places where one is going to get rich. The stock brokers are going to be driving taxis. The smart ones will learn to drive tractors so they can work for the smart farmers. The farmers are going to be driving Lamborghinis. I'm telling you. You should start Forbes Farming." Rogers has been periodically bearish on the US stock market since the 1980s, notably in 1987, 1998, 1999 and 2008. In February 2018, he predicted that the next bear market would be "the worst in our lifetime."

== Bibliography ==
- 1994: Investment Biker: Around the World with Jim Rogers – ISBN 1-55850-529-6
- 2003: Adventure Capitalist: The Ultimate Road Trip – ISBN 0-375-50912-7
- 2004: Hot Commodities: How Anyone Can Invest Profitably in the World's Best Market – ISBN 1-4000-6337-X
- 2007: A Bull in China: Investing Profitably in the World's Greatest Market – ISBN 1-4000-6616-6
- 2009: A Gift to My Children: A Father's Lessons For Life And Investing – ISBN 1-4000-6754-5
- 2013: Street Smarts: Adventures on the Road and in the Markets – ISBN 0-307-98607-1
- 2019: Number One Bestsellers in Japan: The Future of Japan
- 2019: Number One Bestsellers in Japan: A Warning to Japan
