= Microexchanges =

MicroExchanges are lightly staffed, technology-driven marketplaces that have been enabled by the Internet/WWW which bring together buyers and sellers in key niche commodity markets. The marketplaces closely resemble (but are much smaller than) conventional exchange structures. The aim of a microexchange is to reduce costs, improve returns, and facilitate trading in all sorts of physical and intangible products in financial, equity and commodity products both as underlying cash instruments or derivatives products.

The term was first coined by Patrick L. Young, financial innovator and author of various books including "Capital Market Revolution!" during a book tour in 2000. Subsequently, the first "Microexchange Manifesto" was published in his 2001 book "The Promiscuous Investor" and subsequently updated in "New Capital Market Revolution" published in 2002

Many Microexchanges have been subsequently founded. Young himself co-founded the EOEX a market for Essential Oils in Australia with a public announcement in December 2003 and the initial trading commencing in March 2004.

Microexchanges have also been launched for equity trading such as the Aruba Electronic Stock Exchange and Pacific OTC
