= Sample grade =

The term sample grade, in commodities exchange, refers to the lowest quality of a commodity, too low to be acceptable for delivery in satisfaction of futures contracts.
