= Howard Sosin =

American businessman

Howard Sosin was born in Illinois, and for a time was an associate professor at the Columbia Business School. He spent his early career at Bell Labs and subsequently moved to Drexel Burnham Lambert. In 1987, claiming to have "a better model for valuing interest rate swaps," he and two colleagues left Drexel to found American International Group Financial Products, where they took advantage of a triple-A balance sheet to pioneer the creation of many long-dated over-the-counter derivative products. Sosin left AIG in 1993 after a falling out with Chairman Maurice "Hank" Greenberg.
