= Geert Rouwenhorst =

American economist

K. Geert Rouwenhorst is a Dutch-American investor and professor of finance.

He was hired at Yale University in 1990. In 2012, he was appointed the Robert B. and Candice J. Haas Professor at Yale School of Management and deputy director for International Financial Center at Yale. His work has traced the history of mutual funds through 18th century Netherlands. The International Financial Center at Yale also holds the oldest non-defaulted bond in the world.

His work with Gary B. Gorton circa 2012 has been influential in establishing the idea of commodities as an asset class and has fueled the rise of commodity indices and exchange-traded funds. He has studied the relative performance of futures and the underlying commodities.

Rouwenhorst is also a partner at SummerHaven Investment management, a smaller firm which focuses on commodities.

== Degrees ==
- Ph.D. University of Rochester, 1991
- MS University of Rochester, 1988
- BLaw Erasmus University Rotterdam, Rotterdam, The Netherlands, 1986
- MS Erasmus University Rotterdam, Rotterdam, The Netherlands, 1985
