= NCDEX Commodity Index =

Agricultural stock index in India

The NCDEX Commodity Index is an equal-weighted spot price index of 10 agricultural commodities covering different goods such as oils and oilseeds, fibres, etc.

It is the first such index to be launched in India. Based on the components of the spot price index, NCDEX also displays the national index futures- essentially, the no-arbitrage price if one were to buy futures on the spot index. This price is derived by tracking the futures prices of the index components at the same weightage as the spot index. Currently, index futures are not allowed in India under the FCRA (Forward Contracts Regulation Act, 1952), which requires compulsory physical settlement of futures contracts.

Every couple of years, the government updates the index, as it did in 2021, 2023 and 2024.
