= Commodity index fund =

Type of index fund

A commodity index fund is a fund whose assets are invested in financial instruments based on or linked to a commodity price index. In just about every case the index is in fact a commodity futures index.

== Funds that track indexes ==
You cannot invest in an index, but you can invest in a fund. A Commodity Index Fund is a fund which either buys and sells futures to replicate the performance of the index, or sometimes enters into swaps with investment banks who themselves then trade the futures. The biggest and best known such fund is the Pimco Real Return Strategy Fund. There are many other funds, such as:

- Oppenheimer
- iShares S&P GSCI Commodity Indexes Fund
- Barclays
- JP Morgan (1994)

These are very different from, and should not be confused with, commodity funds that hold real assets (oil refineries, farms, forests etc.) such as:

- Chase Physical Commodity Index
- Bear Stearns

== Harper's article ==
A 2010 article in Harper's by Frederick Kaufman alleged that these Commodity Index funds were part of the global food crisis in 2008, including riots in 30 countries, a food price rise of 80 percent between 2005 and 2008, and an increased hunger rate. The article claimed that one mechanism involved was a 'demand shock' on wheat futures caused by the index funds, resulting in a 'contango' wheat market on the Chicago Mercantile Exchange. This allegedly caused prices of wheat to rise much higher than normal, defeating the purpose of the exchanges (price stabilization) in the first place.

== Futures Industry Association ==
Leah McGrath Goodman, a reporter with experience covering commodities markets, described an experience writing about the Goldman Sachs Commodities Index in her book "The Asylum". Around 2007, she wrote an article for the Futures Industry Association trade magazine about the indexes. She concluded the massive amount of money in the indexes following the oil futures market dwarfed the actual oil futures market, by around 5 to 1. She alluded to the theories of Milton Friedman, who believed that inflation was caused by "too many dollars chasing after too few goods". She concluded that the indexes were apparently thus causing oil prices to rise. Her article was dropped after a man from the FIA magazine showed it "to people around Washington" and told her it would be "politically explosive".

== See also ==
- Contango
