= Standard & Poor's Commodity Index =

The Standard & Poor's Commodity Index (SPCI) was a commodity price index that measured the price changes in a cross section of agricultural and industrial commodities with actively traded U.S. futures contracts managed by Standard & Poor. The index covered five sectors - Energy, Metals, Grains, Livestock, and Fibers & Softs. Only commodities that are consumed for industrial use were included in the index. Weights in the index was determined by the dollar value of Commercial Open Interest (COI) for each component commodity, and rebalanced annually each February.

Effective January 31, 2008 Standard & Poor's discontinued calculation and publication of the S&P Commodity Index Series.

== History ==
In 2007, S&P bought 3 commodity indices from Goldman Sachs, this would become the S&P GSCI index, as part of this S&P decided to discontinue its own Standard & Poor's Commodity Index, which it did in 2008.

== Components and weightings (as of 2006) ==
- Natural Gas (17.66%)
- Unleaded Gas (12.16%)
- Heating Oil (12.13%)
- Crude Oil (11.41%)
- Wheat (5.15%)
- Live Cattle (4.87%)
- Corn (4.48%)
- Coffee (3.88%)
- Soybeans (3.84%)
- Sugar (3.80%)
- Silver (3.67%)
- Copper (3.39%)
- Cotton (3.22%)
- Soybean Oil (2.98%)
- Cocoa (2.79%)
- Soybean Meal (2.57%)
- Lean Hogs (2.04%)

== Other indices ==
- Bloomberg Commodity Index (formerly known as Dow Jones–UBS Commodity Index, 2009–2014, formerly known as Dow Jones-AIG Commodity Index 1998–2009)
- Goldman Sachs Commodity Index
- Reuters/Jefferies CRB Index
- Rogers International Commodity Index
