= S&P GSCI =

Investment benchmark

The S&P GSCI (formerly the Goldman Sachs Commodity Index) serves as a benchmark for investment in the commodity markets and as a measure of commodity performance over time. It is a tradable index that is readily available to market participants of the Chicago Mercantile Exchange. The index was originally developed in 1991, by Goldman Sachs. In 2007, ownership transferred to Standard & Poor's, who currently own and publish it. Futures of the S&P GSCI use a multiple of 250. The index contains a much higher exposure to energy than other commodity price indices such as the Bloomberg Commodity Index.

== Index composition ==
The S&P GSCI contains as many commodities as possible, with rules excluding certain commodities to maintain liquidity and investability in the underlying futures markets. The index currently comprises 24 commodities from all commodity sectors - energy products, industrial metals, agricultural products, livestock products and precious metals. The wide range of constituent commodities provides the S&P GSCI with a high level of diversification, across subsectors and within each subsector. This diversity mutes the impact of highly idiosyncratic events, which have large implications for the individual commodity markets, but are minimised when aggregated to the level of the S&P GSCI.

The diversity of the S&P GSCI's constituent commodities, along with their economic weighting allows the index to respond in a stable way to world economic growth, even as the composition of global growth changes across time. When industrialised economies dominate world growth, the metals sector of the GSCI generally responds more than the agricultural components. Conversely, when emerging markets dominate world growth, petroleum-based commodities and agricultural commodities tend to be more responsive.

== Economic weighting ==
The S&P GSCI is a world-production weighted index that is based on the average quantity of production of each commodity in the index, over the last five years of available data. This allows the S&P GSCI to be a measure of investment performance as well as serve as an economic indicator.

Production weighting is a quintessential attribute for the index to be a measure of investment performance. This is achieved by assigning a weight to each asset based on the amount of capital dedicated to holding that asset just as market capitalisation is used to assign weights to components of equity indices. Since the appropriate weight assigned to each commodity is in proportion to the amount of that commodity flowing through the economy, the index is also an economic indicator.

=== Controversy ===
Leah McGrath Goodman, a reporter with experience covering commodities markets, described an experience writing about the Goldman Sachs Commodities Index in her book "The Asylum". Around 2007, she wrote an article for the Futures Industry Association trade magazine about the indexes. She concluded the massive amount of money in the indexes following the oil futures market dwarfed the actual oil futures market, by around 5 to 1. She alluded to the theories of Milton Friedman, who believed that inflation was caused by "too many dollars chasing after too few goods". She concluded that the indexes were apparently thus causing oil prices to rise. Her article was dropped after a man from the FIA magazine showed it "to people around Washington" and told her it would be "politically explosive".

However, in a June 26, 2010 article in The Economist, the argument is made that Index-tracking funds (of which Goldman Sachs Commodity Index was one) did not cause the bubble. It describes a report by the OECD that used data from the Commodity Futures Trading Commission to make the case. For example, the report points out that even commodities without futures markets also saw price rises during the period. However, counter-arguments have been made that the commodities without futures markets saw their prices rise as a consequence of the rising prices of commodities with futures markets: the World Development Movement, a social justice lobbying organization, states there is strong evidence that the rising price of wheat caused the price of rice to subsequently rise.

== Components and weights ==
S&P GSCI Components and Dollar Weights for 2026
Sector	Commodity	Dollar Weight (%)
Energy	WTI Crude Oil	17.79%
Energy	Brent Crude Oil	18.22%
Energy	Gas Oil	5.22%
Energy	Heating Oil	3.69%
Energy	RBOB Gasoline	3.29%
Energy	Natural Gas	3.57%
Energy	Energy Total	51.78%
Agriculture	Chicago Wheat	2.38%
Agriculture	Kansas Wheat	1.24%
Agriculture	Corn	4.67%
Agriculture	Soybeans	3.10%
Agriculture	Coffee	1.85%
Agriculture	Sugar	1.72%
Agriculture	Cocoa	1.18%
Agriculture	Cotton	0.88%
Agriculture	Agriculture Total	17.01%
Industrial Metals	Aluminum	4.28%
Industrial Metals	Copper	5.47%
Industrial Metals	Nickel	0.93%
Industrial Metals	Lead	0.56%
Industrial Metals	Zinc	0.89%
Industrial Metals	Industrial Metals Total	12.13%
Livestock	Live Cattle	5.20%
Livestock	Feeder Cattle	2.68%
Livestock	Lean Hogs	3.31%
Livestock	Livestock Total	11.19%
Precious Metals	Gold	7.24%
Precious Metals	Silver	0.65%
Precious Metals	Precious Metals Total	7.89%

== See also ==
- Goldman roll
- Dow Jones-UBS Commodity Index
- Reuters-CRB Index
- Rogers International Commodity Index
- Standard & Poor's Commodity Index
