= Bloomberg Commodity Index =

Broadly diversified commodity price index

The Bloomberg Commodity Index (BCOM) is a broadly diversified commodity price index distributed by Bloomberg Index Services Limited. The index was originally launched in 1998 as the Dow Jones-AIG Commodity Index (DJ-AIGCI) and renamed to Dow Jones-UBS Commodity Index (DJ-UBSCI) in 2009, when UBS acquired the index from AIG. On July 1, 2014, the index was rebranded under its current name.

The BCOM tracks prices of futures contracts on physical commodities on the commodity markets. The index is designed to minimize concentration in any one commodity or sector. It currently has 23 commodity futures in six sectors. No one commodity can compose more than 15% of the index, no one commodity and its derived commodities can compose more than 25% of the index, and no sector can represent more than 33% of the index (as of the annual weightings of the components). The weightings for each commodity included in BCOM are calculated in accordance with rules account for liquidity and production data in a 2:1 ratio, which ensures that the relative proportion of each of the underlying individual commodities reflects its global economic significance and market liquidity. Annual rebalancing and reweighting ensure that diversity is maintained over time.

== Components and weights ==
Bloomberg Commodity Index Component Target Weights for 2026
Group	Commodity	2026 Target Weight (%)
Energy	Brent Crude Oil	8.36%
Energy	Natural Gas	7.20%
Energy	WTI Crude Oil	6.64%
Energy	Low Sulphur Gas Oil	2.89%
Energy	ULS Diesel	2.19%
Energy	RBOB Gasoline	2.15%
Energy	Energy Total	29.44%
Grains	Corn	5.53%
Grains	Soybeans	5.36%
Grains	Soybean Meal	2.93%
Grains	Soybean Oil	2.82%
Grains	Wheat	2.72%
Grains	HRW Wheat	1.79%
Grains	Grains Total	21.15%
Industrial Metals	COMEX Copper	6.36%
Industrial Metals	LME Aluminum	3.97%
Industrial Metals	LME Zinc	2.25%
Industrial Metals	LME Nickel	2.23%
Industrial Metals	Lead	0.95%
Industrial Metals	Industrial Metals Total	15.76%
Precious Metals	Gold	14.90%
Precious Metals	Silver	3.94%
Precious Metals	Precious Metals Total	18.84%
Softs	Sugar	2.95%
Softs	Coffee	2.91%
Softs	Cocoa	1.71%
Softs	Cotton	1.59%
Softs	Softs Total	9.17%
Livestock	Live Cattle	3.86%
Livestock	Lean Hogs	1.78%
Livestock	Livestock Total	5.64%

== See also ==
- S&P GSCI
- Reuters/Jefferies CRB Index
- Rogers International Commodity Index
- Standard & Poor's Commodity Index
