= Roll yield =

The roll yield is the difference between the profit or loss of a futures contract and the change in the spot price of the underlying asset of that futures contract. Unlike fixed income or dividend yields, a roll yield does not provide a cash payment, and may not be counted as a profit in certain cases if it accounts for the underlying asset's cost-of-carry. Nonetheless, the roll yield is often characterized as a return that a futures investor capture in addition to the price change of the underlying asset of a futures contract.

== Source of roll yield ==
The Theory of storage explains roll yield as a combination of storage costs, convenience yield, and asset yield, or a cost-of-carry in aggregate. In a theoretical efficient market equilibrium with no barriers to arbitrage, an investment strategy of investing in a futures contract should be no more or less profitable than an investment strategy of holding the underlying asset and paying its cost-of-carry. If one of these strategies is relatively more profitable, participants in the other strategy would shift resources to arbitrage the relatively more profitable strategy until the return advantage disappear. So the profit or loss from holding a futures contract to a certain time should be equal to the profit or loss from storing an asset to sell at that same time and paying the cost-of-carry for that asset. In most cases, the cost-of-carry is harder to observe than the spot price of the underlying asset, which leads market participants to ignore the cost-of-carry, and compare the profit and loss of futures contracts to the spot price of the underlying assets directly as the roll yield. The roll yield in this case is exactly equal to the cost-of-carry due to arbitrage.

In most practical cases, it is difficult to confirm that the roll yield is equal to the cost-of-carry, as the convenience yield portion of the cost-of-carry is only observable in perfectly efficient futures and spot markets, which rarely exists in the real world. When positive, convenience yield is the money that spot market participants would pay futures market participants to avoid selling an asset at the current moment, and to have the real option of selling it later. Market participants would pay this amount in order to have assets in storage to meet unexpected demand of that asset or its products, to use those assets to avoid shortages of inputs into a production process, or due to some other incentive for storing the asset to sell later. When negative, convenience yield is the money that spot market participants would charge futures market participants to avoid selling an asset at the current moment. Market participants would charge this amount to compensate themselves for not selling the asset immediately; they might require this compensation if their storage capacity is running out, if the underlying asset spoils with time, or if they have some other incentive to get rid of the asset immediately. Storage costs and asset yields are relatively easy to observe, and under perfectly efficient markets, the convenience yield can theoretically be measured as difference between the roll yield, and the sum of storage costs and asset yield. However, in the less-than-perfectly efficient markets in the real world, that difference might contain price biases that do not reflect the convenience yield.

Since the cost-of-carry is difficult to observe, the roll yield may or may not be a gain or loss to investors.

== Characterization as a gain or a loss ==
Roll yield is often characterized as an extra gain or loss that a futures investor captures in addition to the change in the spot price of the underlying asset. However, this is only the case for less-than-perfectly efficient markets when the roll yield is greater than the cost-of-carry.

For example, suppose the spot price of oil is $58 and the market is inverted because inventories are relatively low. This means the first futures price might be at $59 and the next contract at $60. Investors can go long the front contract as described above. Suppose that the spot price remains constant, the futures contract you own moves toward the spot price as delivery approaches, and the spread between the current futures contract and the next futures contract stays at a dollar. Investors can sell the maturing futures near the $58 spot price and buy the next future for around $59. The $1 difference between the maturing futures contract sell price, $58, and the spot price, $59, is the roll yield. In the above characterization, the profit from holding physical oil is assumed to be $0, while the loss from holding the futures contract is calculated as -$1; however, this is only true if the cost-of-carry equals $0. Suppose the cost-of-carry equals $1, from $1 in storage costs and $0 from convenience yield, the roll yield is fully explained by the cost-of-carry. In this case, investors did not suffer a loss by paying roll yield, since as an alternative investors would have to pay an equal amount of cost-of-carry to hold the physical asset.

Now suppose that the cost-of-carry equals $0.50, from $0.50 in storage costs and $0 from convenience yield. The futures market is inefficient, since it would be profitable for market participants to conduct the following arbitrage: purchase spot oil at $58, pay storage costs of $0.50, sell short futures contracts at $59, deliver oil at $58 at contract expiry, and gain $1 from the short futures contracts at expiry to gain risk-free profits of $0.50. Market participants would have incentive to conduct this arbitrage until the selling pressure brings futures contract prices down to $58.50, when they no longer have incentive to conduct the above arbitrage. However, market participants may face obstacles to conduct the above arbitrage; they might have difficulty obtaining physical oil storage, they might lack to scale to purchase oil at the spot market price, and they might face other obstacles. In this case, when futures traders suffer a -$1 loss from purchasing futures at $59 and rolling the contracts at $58, $0.50 of the roll yield will be justified storage cost, and $0.50 will be from an inefficient price bias that could be described as a real roll yield loss.

In the above example, the price bias is visible because the convenience yield is held constant at $0. Since convenience yield is often measured as the residual of subtracting the storage cost and any asset yield from the roll yield, it is difficult to separate that residual into a true convenience yield and a true market price bias. Consider the above example in one case where the true convenience yield is $1, and another case where the true convenience yield is -$1. In both cases, the observed difference between the roll yield and the cost-of-carry is still $0.50, but the price bias is -$0.50 and $1.50. In these cases, the observed difference between the roll yield and the cost-of-carry is neither a good estimator for the cost-of-carry nor for the price bias.

== Effect on commodity returns ==
Roll yield can have a strong impact on the return of futures trading. The contango exhibited in Crude Oil in 2009 explains the discrepancy between the headline spot price increase (bottoming at $35 and topping $80 in the year) and the various tradeable instruments for Crude Oil (such as rolled contracts or longer-dated futures contracts) showing a much lower price increase, because of the strong negative roll yield. The USO ETF (using futures contracts) also failed to replicate Crude Oil's spot price performance.

Levine, Ooi, Richardson, and Sasseville (2018) found that the roll yield, after adjusting for interest rates, made up the majority of average returns for a long-run index of commodity futures going back 140 years.
