= Commodity =

Fungible item produced to satisfy wants or needs

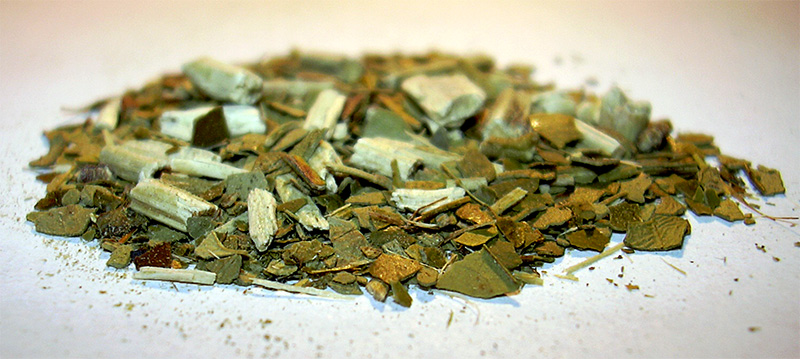
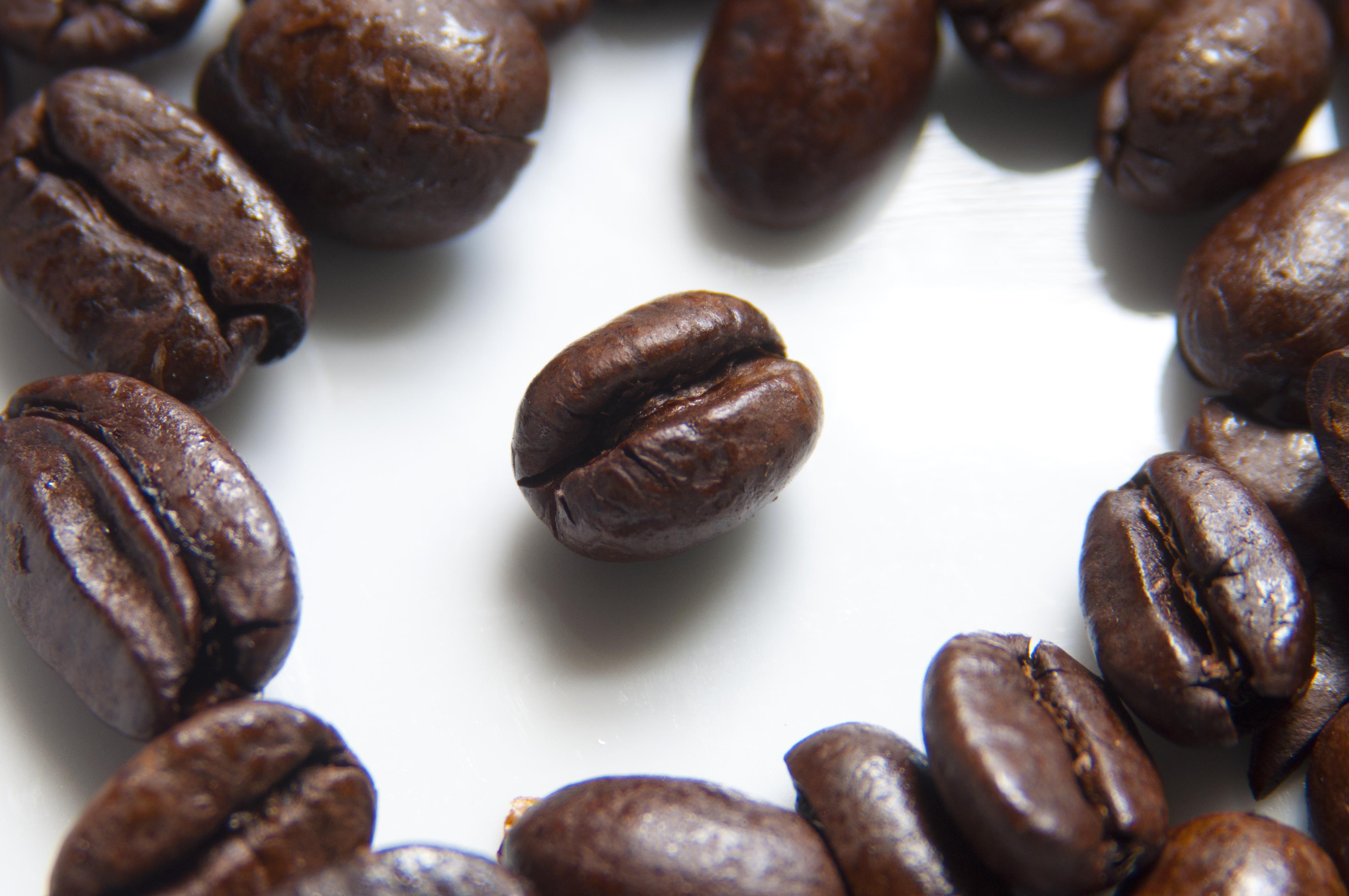
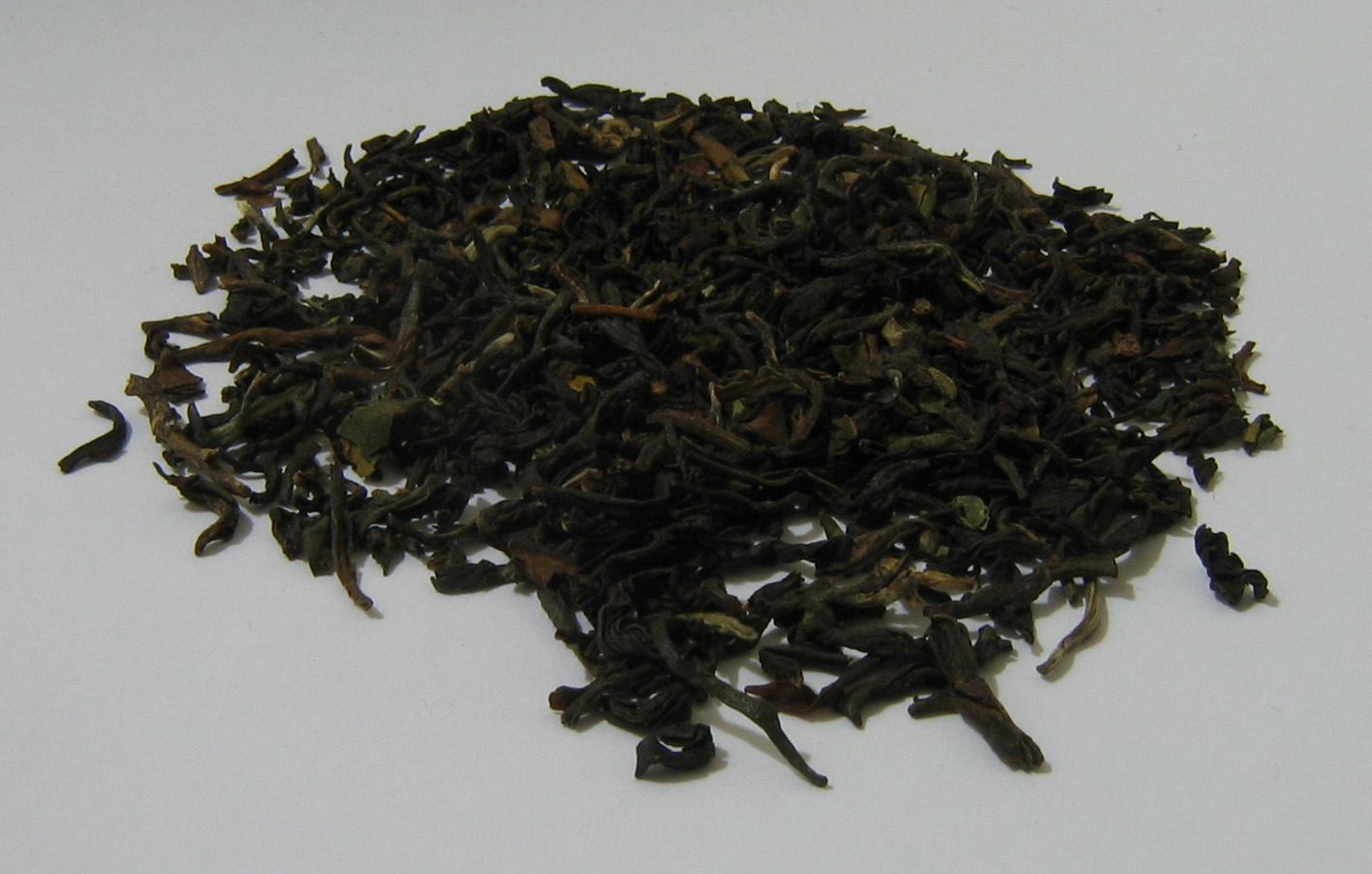
Yerba mate (left), coffee bean (middle) and tea (right), all used for caffeinated infusions, are commodity cash crops.

In economics, a commodity is an economic good, usually a resource, that specifically has full or substantial fungibility: that is, the market treats instances of the good as equivalent or nearly so with no regard to who produced them.

The price of a commodity good is typically determined as a function of its market as a whole: well-established physical commodities have actively traded spot and derivative markets. The wide availability of commodities typically leads to smaller profit margins and diminishes the importance of factors (such as brand name) other than price.

Most commodities are raw materials, basic resources, agricultural, or mining products, such as iron ore, sugar, or grains like rice and wheat. Commodities can also be mass-produced unspecialized products such as chemicals and computer memory. Popular commodities include crude oil, corn, and gold.

Other definitions of commodity include something useful or valued and an alternative term for an economic good or service available for purchase in the market. In such standard works as Alfred Marshall's Principles of Economics (1890) and Léon Walras's Elements of Pure Economics (1874) commodity serves as general term for an economic good or service.

== Etymology ==
The word commodity came into use in English in the 15th century, from the French commodité, "amenity, convenience". Going further back, the French word derives from the Latin commoditas, meaning "suitability, convenience, advantage". The Latin word commodus (from which English gets other words including commodious and accommodate) meant variously "appropriate", "proper measure, time, or condition", and "advantage, benefit".

== Description ==
=== Characteristics ===
In economics, the term commodity is used specifically for economic goods that have full or partial but substantial fungibility; that is, the market treats their instances as equivalent or nearly so with no regard to who produced them. Karl Marx described this property as follows: "From the taste of wheat, it is not possible to tell who produced it, a Russian serf, a French peasant or an English capitalist." Petroleum and copper are examples of commodity goods: their supply and demand are a part of one universal market.

Non-commodity items such as stereo systems have many aspects of product differentiation, such as the brand, the user interface and the perceived quality. The demand for one type of stereo may be much larger than demand for another.

The price of a commodity good is typically determined as a function of its market as a whole. Well-established physical commodities have actively traded spot and derivative markets.

=== Hard and soft commodities ===
World exports of cereals by main commodities

Soft commodities are goods that are grown, such as wheat, or rice.

Hard commodities are mined. Examples include gold, silver, helium, oil.

Energy commodities include electricity, gas, coal and oil. Electricity has the particular characteristic that it is usually uneconomical to store, and must therefore be consumed as soon as it is produced.

== Commoditization ==
Commoditization occurs as a goods or services market loses differentiation across its supply base, often by the diffusion of the intellectual capital necessary to acquire or produce it efficiently. Goods that formerly carried premium margins for market participants have become commodities, such as generic pharmaceuticals and DRAM chips. An article in The New York Times cites multivitamin supplements as an example of commoditization; a 50 mg tablet of calcium is of equal value to a consumer no matter what company produces and markets it, and as such, multivitamins are now sold in bulk and are available at any supermarket with little brand differentiation. Following this trend, nanomaterials are emerging from carrying premium profit margins for market participants to a status of commodification.

There is a spectrum of commoditization, rather than a binary distinction of "commodity versus differentiable product". Few products have complete undifferentiability and hence fungibility; even electricity can be differentiated in the market based on its method of generation (e.g., fossil fuel, wind, solar), in markets where energy choice lets a buyer opt (and pay more) for renewable methods if desired. Many products' degree of commoditization depends on the buyer's mentality and means. For example, milk, eggs, and notebook paper are not differentiated by many customers; for them, the product is fungible and lowest price is the main decisive factor in the purchasing choice. Other customers take into consideration other factors besides price, such as environmental sustainability and animal welfare. To these customers, distinctions such as "organic versus not" or "cage free versus not" count toward differentiating brands of milk or eggs, and percentage of recycled content or Forest Stewardship Council certification count toward differentiating brands of notebook paper.

== Commodity trade ==
In the original and simplified sense, commodities were things of value, of uniform quality, that were produced in large quantities by many different producers; the items from each different producer were considered equivalent. On a commodity exchange, it is the underlying standard stated in the contract that defines the commodity, not any quality inherent in a specific producer's product.

Commodities exchanges include:

- Bourse Africa (formerly GBOT)
- Bursa Malaysia Derivatives (MDEX)
- Chicago Board of Trade (CBOT)
- Chicago Mercantile Exchange (CME)
- Dalian Commodity Exchange (DCE)
- Euronext.liffe (LIFFE)
- Kansas City Board of Trade (KCBT)
- London Metal Exchange (LME)
- Marché à Terme International de France (MATIF)
- Mercantile Exchange Nepal Limited (MEX)
- Multi Commodity Exchange (MCX)
- National Commodity and Derivatives Exchange (NCDEX)
- National Commodity Exchange Limited (NCEL)
- New York Mercantile Exchange (NYMEX)
- Yiwu International Trade City (Yiwu Market)

Markets for trading commodities can be very efficient, particularly if the division into pools matches demand segments. These markets will quickly respond to changes in supply and demand to find an equilibrium price and quantity. In addition, investors can gain passive exposure to the commodity markets through a commodity price index.

In order to diversify their investments and mitigate the risks associated with inflationary debasement of currencies, pension funds and sovereign wealth funds allocate capital increasingly to non-listed assets such as a commodities and commodity-related infrastructure.

== Commodification of labour ==
In classical political economy and especially in Karl Marx's critique of political economy, a commodity is an object or a good or service ("product" or "activity") produced by human labour. Objects are external to man. However, some objects attain "use value" to persons in this world, when they are found to be "necessary, useful or pleasant in life". "Use value" makes an object "an object of human wants", or "a means of subsistence in the widest sense".

As society developed, people found that they could trade goods and services for other goods and services. At this stage, these goods and services became "commodities". According to Marx, commodities are defined as objects which are offered for sale or are "exchanged in a market". In the marketplace, where commodities are sold, "use value" is not helpful in facilitating the sale of commodities. Accordingly, in addition to having use value, commodities must have an "exchange value"—a value that could be expressed in the market.

Prior to Marx, many economists debated as to what elements made up exchange value. Adam Smith maintained that exchange value was made up of rent, profit, labour and the costs of wear and tear on the instruments of husbandry. David Ricardo, a follower of Adam Smith, modified Smith's approach on this point by alleging that labour alone is the content of the exchange value of any good or service. While maintaining that all exchange value in commodities was derived directly from the hands of the people that made the commodity, Ricardo noted that only part of the exchange value of the commodity was paid to the worker who made the commodity. The other part of the value of this particular commodity was labour that was not paid to the worker—unpaid labour. This unpaid labour was retained by the owner of the means of production. In capitalist society, the capitalist owns the means of production and therefore the unpaid labour is retained by the capitalist as rent or as profit. The means of production means the site where the commodity is made, the raw products that are used in the production and the instruments or machines that are used for the production of the commodity.

However, not all commodities are reproducible nor were all commodities originally intended to be sold in the market. These priced goods are also treated as commodities, e.g. human labour-power, works of art and natural resources ("earth itself is an instrument of labour"), even though they may not be produced specifically for the market, or be non-reproducible goods.

Marx's analysis of the commodity is intended to help solve the problem of what establishes the economic value of goods, using the labour theory of value. This problem was extensively debated by Adam Smith, David Ricardo and Karl Rodbertus-Jagetzow among others.

All three of the above-mentioned economists rejected the theory that labour composed 100% of the exchange value of any commodity. In varying degrees, these economists turned to supply and demand to establish the price of commodities. Marx held that the "price" and the "value" of a commodity were not synonymous. Price of any commodity would vary according to the imbalance of supply to demand at any one period of time. The "value" of the same commodity would be consistent and would reflect the amount of labour value used to produce that commodity.

Prior to Marx, economists noted that the problem with using the "quantity of labour" to establish the value of commodities was that the time spent by an unskilled worker would be longer than the time spent on the same commodity by a skilled worker. Thus, under this analysis, the commodity produced by an unskilled worker would be more valuable than the same commodity produced by the skilled worker. Marx pointed out, however, that in society at large, an average amount of time that was necessary to produce the commodity would arise. This average time necessary to produce the commodity Marx called the "socially necessary labour time". Socially necessary labour time was the proper basis on which to base the "exchange value" of a given commodity.

== Commodity super cycle ==
Commodity super cycles are periods of time, around a decade, where commodities as a whole trade at a price that is greater than their long term moving average. A super cycle will usually occur when there is large industrial and commercial change in a country or world that requires more resources to support the change. As prices rise, goods and services that rely on commodities rise with them.

=== History of super cycles ===
There have been four super cycles over the last 120 years worldwide. The first commodity super cycle started in late 1890 and was accelerated on the back of widespread U.S. industrialization and World War I. In 1917 commodity prices peaked and then entered a downtrend to the 1930s. As war erupted in Europe in the late 1930s and eventually including the U.S., the world saw a new cycle begin. Countries were not just preparing for war but also for the aftermath of World War II as large parts of Europe and Asia faced heavy rebuilding. This cycle eventually peaked in 1951 and faded away in the early 70s. In the 1970s as world economies grew, they needed more materials and energy to support expansion leading to increases in prices across the board. This boom came to an end as foreign investments fled as extractive industries became nationalized. The most recent of commodity super cycles began in 2000 as China joined the World Trade Organization. China was also in the beginning of their boom as industry and expansion took off. Workers moved into cities as emerging industries took off and offered a lot of new jobs and opportunities. In 2008 when the Great Recession hit, it put a halt onto the supercycle as GDP's across the world tanked leaving many economies in recessions.

The next or the fifth super cycle could arrive as the world enters the final phases of the COVID-19 pandemic and starts to build massive clean energy infrastructure in view of the commodity price increase.

== See also ==
- 2000s commodities boom
- Article of commerce
  - Commodification
  - Commodity fetishism
- Commercial off-the-shelf or "commercially available off-the-shelf" (COTS)
- Commodity currency
- Commodity market risk and values
- Commodity money
- Commodity price shocks
- Commodity price index
- Heterogeneity in economics
- List of traded commodities
- Sample grade
- Standardization
- Trade
