= FTSE/CoreCommodity CRB Index =

Commodity futures price index

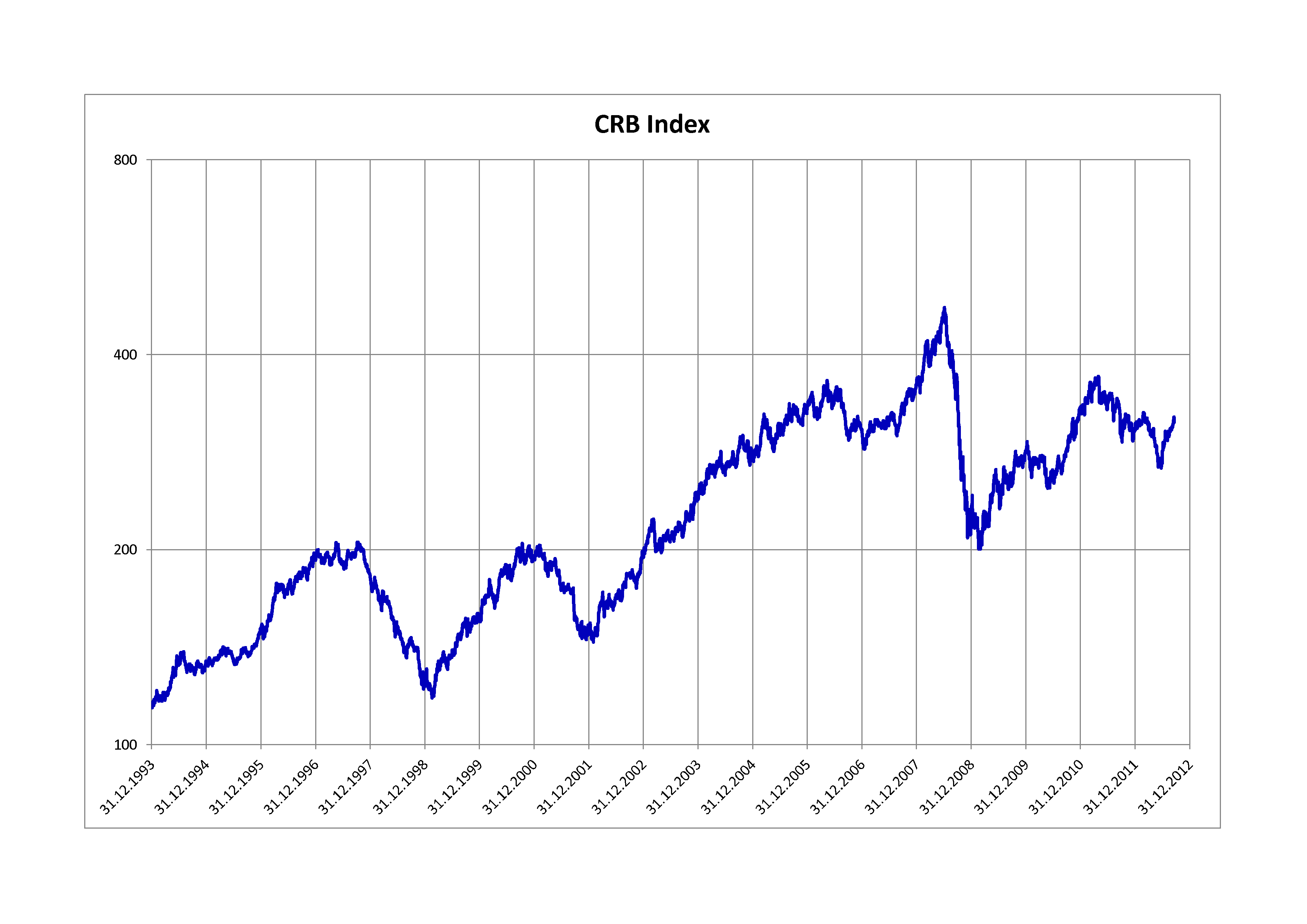
FTSE/CoreCommodity CRB Index 1993–2012

The FTSE/CoreCommodity CRB Index (FTSE/CC CRB) is a commodity futures price index. It was first calculated by Commodity Research Bureau, Inc. in 1957 and made its inaugural appearance in the 1958 CRB Commodity Year Book.

The Index was originally composed of 28 commodities, 26 of which were traded on exchanges in the U.S. and Canada, and two cash markets. It included barley and flaxseed from the Winnipeg exchange; cocoa, coffee "B", copper, cotton, cottonseed oil, grease wool, hides, lead, potatoes, rubber, sugar #4, sugar #6, wool tops and zinc from New York exchanges; and corn, eggs, lard, oats, onions, rye, soybeans, soybean meal, soybean oil and wheat from Chicago exchanges. In addition to those 26 markets, the Index also included the spot New Orleans cotton and Minneapolis wheat markets which were added to balance some commodities repeated in the Index as by-products of other commodities.

The original base period was 1947-49, the same as the Bureau of Labor Statistics Spot Market Index. This was purposely done to facilitate easy comparison of both spot and futures indexes.

The FTSE/CoreCommodity CRB Index (FTSE/CC CRB) was originally designed to provide dynamic representation of broad trends in overall commodity prices. In order to ensure that it continued to fulfill that role, its components and formula have been periodically adjusted to reflect changes in market structure and activity. Since 1957, there have been ten revisions to Index components. The first was in 1961 and the latest in 2026.

In the original calculation, all future deliveries up to a year ahead were averaged to calculate the current price. In 1987, the calculation was changed to only include deliveries nine months forward. In 1989, all non-cycle months were excluded from the calculation.

The 1995 revision lowers the number of forward deliveries included to those within six months of the current date, up to a maximum of five delivery months per commodity. However, a minimum of two delivery months must be used to calculate the current price, even if the second contract is outside of the six-month window.

There has also been a continuous adjustment of the individual components used in calculating the Index since the original 28 were chosen in 1957. All of these changes have been part of the continuing effort of LSEG to ensure that its value provides accurate representation of broad commodity price trends.

It currently is made up of 22 commodities as quoted on the NYMEX, CBOT, LME, CME and COMEX exchanges. These are sorted into 4 groups, each with different weightings. These groups are:

- Petroleum based products (based on their importance to global trade, always make up 33% of the weightings)
- Liquid assets
- Highly liquid assets
- Diverse commodities.

The index comprises 22 commodities: aluminum, cocoa, coffee, copper, corn, cotton, crude oil, gold, heating oil, lean hogs, live cattle, natural gas, nickel, zinc, silver, soybeans, sugar, unleaded gas, srw wheat, soybean oil, soybean meal and kc wheat.

The tenth revision of the index renamed it the FTSE/Core Commodity CRB Index, or FTSE/CC CRB.

== See also ==
- FTSE Russell
- Commodity price index
- S&P GSCI
