= Rogers International Commodity Index =

Index of commodity futures

- Foundation: 1996; 30 years ago
- Trading symbol: MRIC
- Constituents: Commodities - Broad basket
- Weighting method: Total return index
- Bloomberg: RICIGLTR:IND

The Rogers International Commodity Index (RICI) is a broad index of commodity futures designed by Jim Rogers in 1996/1997. The first fund tracking the index began on July 31, 1998.

== Overview ==
The index was designed to meet the need for consistent investing in commodities through a broad-based international vehicle. The index tracks 38 commodity futures contracts from 13 international exchanges. The list of commodities is subject to change by the RICI Committee. In general, a commodity will be considered fit to be included in the index if it plays a significant role in worldwide (developed and developing countries) consumption. If one particular commodity is being traded on more than one international exchange, the most liquid contract globally, in terms of volume and open interest combined, is then selected for inclusion in the index. Liquidity is also used in determining weights in the Index.

The index is divided into three sub-indices, which reflect the three sub-segments of the RICI - RICI Agriculture, RICI Energy and RICI Metals. The sub-indices' contribution to main index from the beginning are Agriculture - 34.90%, Energy - 44.00%, Metals - 21.10% according to the RICI Handbook (see reference below).

== Calculation key points ==
Calculation is being done in realtime and settlement values are being published daily.

Each commodity is rebalanced on the start of each month towards initial weights, determined annually by the RICI Committee as discussed in the RICI Handbook (see reference below). The RICI has had very few changes since 1996 making it the most stable, consistent, and transparent of all the commodity indexes. When one invests in the RICI, one knows what one will own a few years down the road in sharp contrast to the other commodity indexes which change significantly.

For each commodity, the most valid (most actively traded from the committee point of view) expiration is chosen to be included into the RICI calculation. The index is rolled at the end of each month to contracts that are expected to be most active during the next month. Generally, if the next calendar month of a futures contract includes a first notice day, a delivery day or historical evidence that liquidity migrates to a next contract month during this period, then the next contract month is intended to be applied to calculate the index – taking legal constraints into account.

The index calculation methodology is reviewed annually by the index committee during its meeting in December and possibly amended thereafter. Meetings can be called at any time if conditions warrant it.

The RICI's website (http://www.rogersrawmaterials.com/) is not working from June 02, 2021. According to recent RJA Prospectus "The RICI - Total Return Index and the [relevant sub -] Index are published by Beeland Interests, Inc."
