= Goldkenn =

Swiss chocolate company

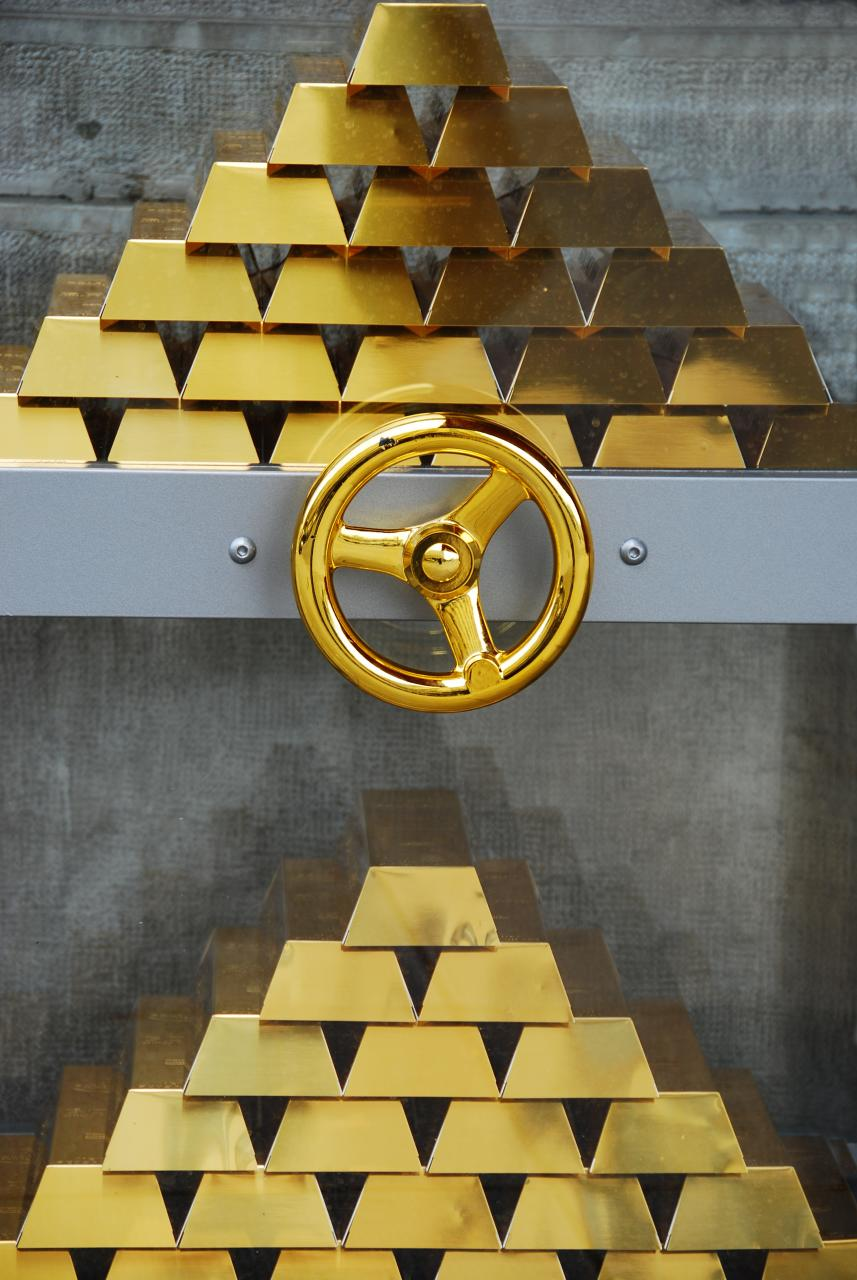
A display of Goldkenn praline boxes

Goldkenn is an industrial Swiss chocolate producer based in Le Locle. It was founded in Geneva in 1980, by Steven Goldstein and Christian Belce-Kennedy, the company name being the combination of the two surnames. The company started selling old-looking wooden chocolate boxes in duty-free stores, in collaboration with Favarger.

Goldkenn essentially produces liquor-filled chocolate bars and pralines. The Goldkenn pralines are distinctively packed into gold bullion replicas. Milk chocolate gold coins are also produced. Small Goldkenn ingot-shaped chocolate bars were notably served on Swissair flights in the 1990s.

Goldkenn is part of the Choco-Diffusion group since 2010. It moved from Geneva to Le Locle in 2011.

In 2014, the campaign for the Save our Swiss Gold initiative, calling on the Swiss National Bank to maintain minimum gold reserves, was launched. The supporters of the initiative displayed a pile of Goldkenn bullion replicas at the press conference.

The Goldkenn logo features the Matterhorn.

== See also ==
- Swiss chocolate
