= Gold repatriation =

Relocation of sovereign gold reserves

Gold repatriation is the process by which governments and central banks relocate sovereign gold reserves from foreign vaults back to domestic storage. Historically driven by bilateral trade reallocations or immediate security concerns, modern gold repatriation has evolved into an accelerating global trend. According to annual surveys by the World Gold Council, the proportion of central banks opting to store their sovereign bullion assets domestically has risen significantly as institutions progressively prioritise absolute domestic control over foreign storage networks.

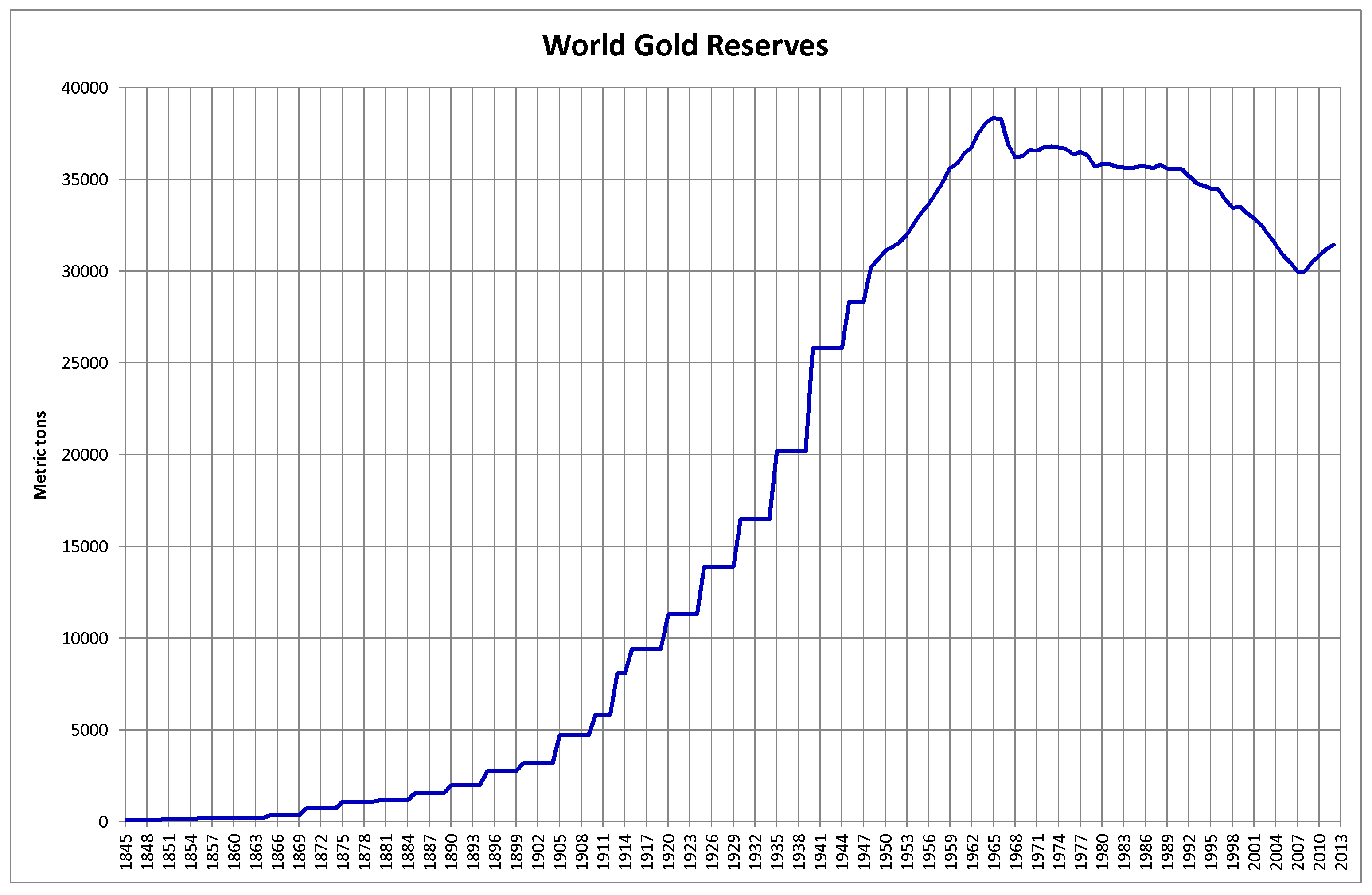
World Gold Reserves from 1845 to 2013, in tonnes.

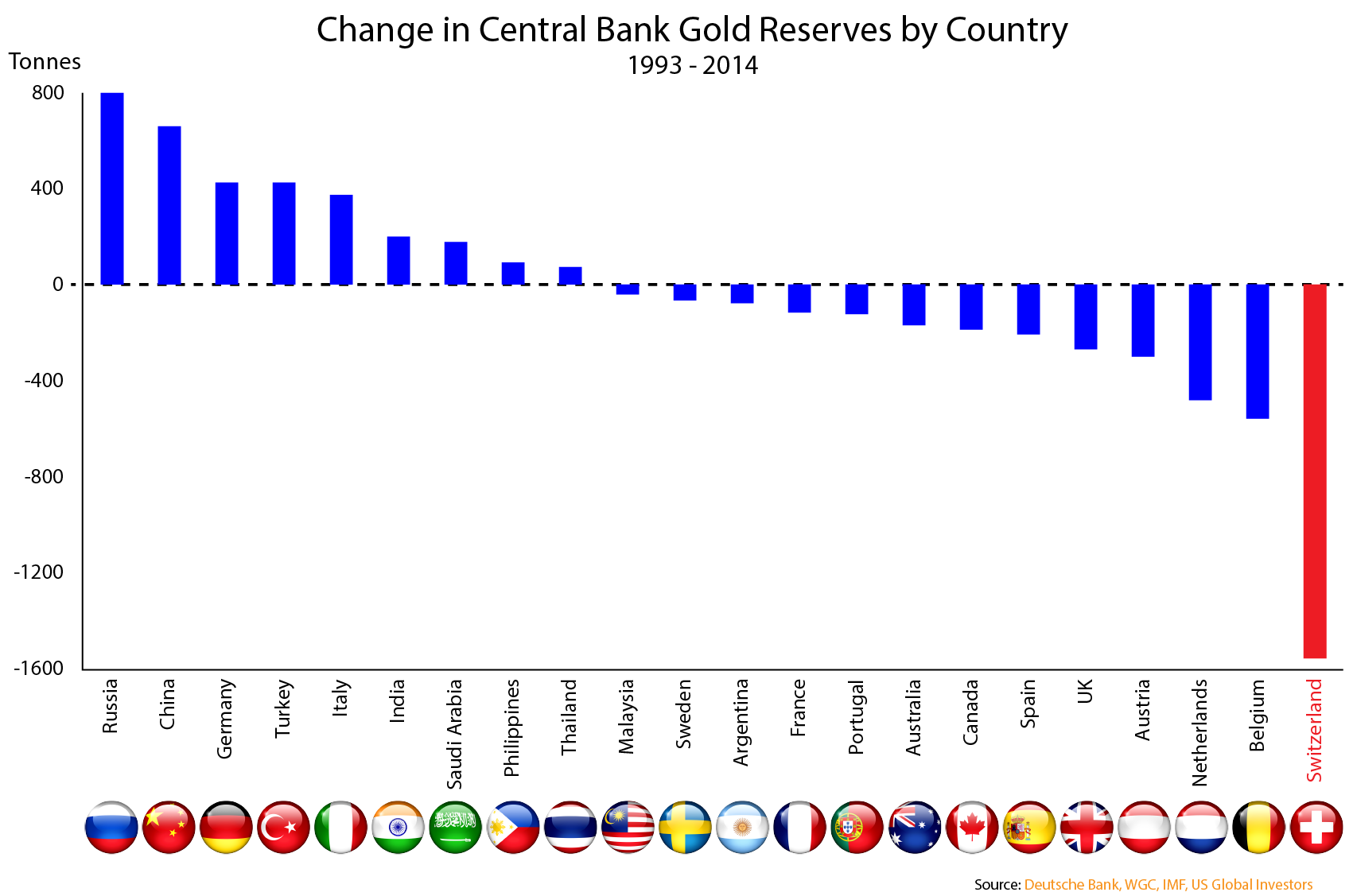
Changes in central bank gold reserves by country 1993–2014. Switzerland sold three times more gold than any other country.

Many nations have traditionally used foreign vaults for the safe-keeping of a significant portion of their sovereign gold reserves. In 2014, a localised movement emerged among several European states to return gold stored abroad back to their owner countries; however, while early waves were driven primarily by post-financial crisis risk diversification, the momentum for global gold repatriation accelerated significantly following the 2022 freezing of Russian central bank foreign reserves by G7 jurisdictions. This unprecedented enforcement action exposed the structural counterparty risks of offshore custody, prompting major central banks across Europe and emerging markets to systematically restructure their storage allocations and shift billions of dollars in physical bullion back to domestic vaults or local trading hubs to guarantee absolute sovereign asset control.

This structural shift has manifested in several significant national operations. Earlier waves saw Austria successfully complete a five-year repatriation plan in 2020 to bring half of its reserves back to Vienna, while nations like Serbia and Poland executed substantial repatriations from European hubs to achieve absolute domestic asset isolation.

More recently, the Reserve Bank of India undertook a historic 100-tonne relocation from London back to domestic vaults to optimise storage architecture and secure sovereign control, and the central bank of the Netherlands systematically reduced its gold reserves stored in the New York Federal Reserve and the Bank of Canada from over 70% down to 37% across a series of structural reorganisations concluding in 2026.

== Active domestic repatriations ==
This section details nations whose central banks have physically relocated, or are actively in the process of relocating, sovereign gold bullion to be stored within domestic vaults.

=== Austria ===
Austria's central bank, the Oesterreichische Nationalbank (OeNB), manages 280 tonnes of sovereign gold reserves. In May 2015, citing a need for risk diversification following warnings from the country's Court of Audit regarding concentration risk, the OeNB announced a major restructuring of its storage policy. At the time of the announcement, Austria held 80% of its 280 tonnes of gold in London, 17% in Austria, and 3% in Switzerland.

The repatriation process began in October 2015 and was gradually implemented over a five-year period. Upon its completion in 2020, the geographical allocation was successfully rebalanced to hold 50% (140 tonnes) domestically in Vienna, 20% in Switzerland, and the remaining 30% in London.

=== France ===
In January 2026, France finalised the repatriation of foreign-held gold reserves—principally those in the United States—concluding a long-term process that began in 1963. The majority of France's gold reserves are in internationally compliant standard form, with the exception of 134 tonnes of its total of approximately 2,437 tonnes, which are slated for upgrade by 2028. The transfer process involved a series of 26 transactions where non-standard bullion held in the Federal Reserve Bank of New York was sold and replaced by London Good Delivery bars purchased within Europe. The combined sale of the final 129 tonnes resulted in a realised capital gain of €12.8 billion. With the conclusion of this operation, 100% of France's strategic gold reserves are now held domestically within the vaults of the Banque de France in Paris.

=== Germany ===
In January 2013, Deutsche Bundesbank, the German central bank initiated a program to repatriate 300 tonnes of its 1,500 tonne reserve from the U.S., and 374 tonnes from France by 2020, in order to store at least half of its official gold reserves in Frankfurt. The operation concluded successfully in 2017, three years ahead of schedule.

The gold stored in the U.S. was acquired by West Germany during a period of trade surpluses with the U.S. before 1970. The gold was never repatriated to Germany due to fear of invasion by the Soviet Union. In 2013, five tonnes were repatriated due to logistical difficulties. However, 120 tonnes in 2014 (35 tonnes from Paris, 85 tonnes from New York); a further 210 tonnes in 2015 (110.5 tonnes from Paris and 99.5 tonnes from New York); and 200 tonnes in 2016, were repatriated. The remaining 139 tonnes, (91 tonnes from Paris and 48 tonnes from New York), were returned in 2017, successfully concluding the program.

As of early 2026, Germany holds 1,236 tonnes (approximately 37%) of its 3,352-tonne gold reserve at the Federal Reserve Bank of New York, with another 13% stored at the Bank of England. While the Deutsche Bundesbank completed its major repatriation of 674 tonnes of gold in 2017, shifting transatlantic relations, record gold prices, and concern over the predictability of U.S. policy under the second Trump administration precipitated renewed calls from German economists and politicians for a full withdrawal from U.S. vaults. However, government and Bundesbank officials stressed that no formal plan to withdraw the remaining gold was under consideration, officially maintaining that they have no further plans to repatriate foreign-held reserves and reaffirming confidence in the New York Federal Reserve as a trustworthy partner.

=== India ===
The historical backdrop of India's gold management is deeply tied to the 1991 Indian economic crisis. Confronted with a severe balance of payments emergency and depleted foreign currency reserves, the Indian government was compelled to physically airlift 46.91 tonnes of sovereign gold to the vaults of the Bank of England and the Bank of Japan to secure a crucial $400 million emergency loan. This event remained a powerful symbol of economic vulnerability in national policy memory, and following the stabilising of the economy, the state systematically sought asset independence, notably purchasing 200 tonnes of gold from the International Monetary Fund (IMF) in 2009 to diversify its structural reserves.

Between 2023 and 2026, the RBI fundamentally restructured its geographic allocation, executing the largest coordinated domestic relocation of gold in the nation's modern history. The Reserve Bank of India (RBI) manages one of the largest sovereign gold caches in the world, with total reserves expanding significantly to reach approximately 880 metric tonnes by late 2025. Driven by a desire to reduce ongoing offshore storage fees and an increasing urgency to establish direct, unencumbered custody over strategic assets following Western freezes of foreign central bank holdings, India repatriated approximately 274 tonnes of physical gold from European vaults. This operation included a highly publicised 100-tonne physical airlift from London in May 2024, followed shortly by another major secret 102-tonne transfer later that year.

As a result of these multi-stage operations, the portion of India's sovereign gold held domestically inside high-security vaults in Mumbai and Nagpur expanded to roughly 77% of its total reserves, completely reversing the legacy of 1991. Beyond physical repatriation, the central bank has increasingly pivoted to sourcing new bullion directly from local domestic gold refineries, systematically expanding its asset base entirely within Indian jurisdiction to insulate the nation's monetary reserves from external systemic and currency shocks.

=== Poland ===
The National Bank of Poland (Polish: Narodowy Bank Polski; NBP) maintains a substantial sovereign gold reserve, which was aggressively expanded through heavy market purchases between 2018 and 2025 to surpass 400 tonnes. A key milestone in Poland's modern storage strategy occurred between July and November 2019, when the NBP executed a complex, discrete logistical operation to repatriate 100 tonnes of physical gold bullion (consisting of 8,000 standard 12.5-kilogram bars valued at approximately $4.7 billion) from the vaults of the Bank of England.

The historical provenance of Poland's repatriated gold dates back to the outbreak of the Second World War in September 1939. Fearing imminent seizure by invading German forces, Polish authorities orchestrated a dramatic wartime evacuation of the nation's entire 80-tonne gold reserve. The bullion was secretly transported across three continents on a perilous journey spanning Romania, Turkey, Africa, and France, before eventually being split for post-war safekeeping between the Bank of Canada in Ottawa, the Federal Reserve Bank of New York, and the Bank of England in London, where a significant portion remained for decades.

The 2019 repatriation was coordinated under intense operational security by G4S International Logistics alongside British and Polish police forces. Over the course of several months, the operation was executed across eight discrete nighttime phases. During each phase, armoured security trucks loaded with custom wooden crates of bullion travelled under cover of darkness from a secret facility north-west of London to an undisclosed commercial airport under full police escort and helicopter surveillance. The cargo was then loaded onto Boeing 737 freighter aircraft and flown to military airbases in Poland, where heavily armed motorcades transferred the bars to reinforced underground treasury vaults in Warsaw and Wrocław. Following its completion, NBP Governor Adam Glapiński declared the physical return of the wartime gold to be a historic symbol of Poland's modern economic strength and geopolitical sovereignty.

=== Serbia ===
Between 2021 and 2025, the National Bank of Serbia executed a comprehensive repatriation strategy to bring its entire sovereign gold reserve onto domestic soil. The process began in 2021 with the repatriation of 13 tonnes of bullion held in European vaults, a strategy accelerated following the 2022 freezing of Russian central bank assets by G7 jurisdictions.

In July 2025, the central bank finalised the transfer of its final 5 tonnes stored in Switzerland, concentrating the nation's entire 50.5-tonne gold cache (valued at approximately $6 billion) inside the central bank vaults in Belgrade to insulate the state against external geopolitical crises. This operation made Serbia the first nation in Eastern Europe to fully remove its monetary bullion reserves from global storage hubs.

=== Turkey ===
In 2002, around 90% of Turkey's 120 tonnes of gold reserves were reportedly held abroad, including in the United Kingdom, the United States and Switzerland. In 2017, the Central Bank of the Republic of Turkey withdrew all 28.7 tonnes of its gold held at the Federal Reserve Bank of New York, as part of a broader effort to increase domestic control over the country’s gold reserves. Turkey also repatriated 18.7 tonnes of gold previously held at the Bank for International Settlements in Switzerland. By 2018, Turkish sources reported that around 350 tonnes of gold previously held abroad, including in the United States, Switzerland and the United Kingdom, had been repatriated to Turkey.

Despite the initial repatriation drive, Turkey subsequently rebuilt its foreign-held gold reserves—accumulating a total stockpile of over 791.4 metric tonnes valued at roughly $135 billion. A significant portion of its overseas reserves remains anchored at the Bank of England in London, where holdings reached over 111 tonnes (approximately $30 billion) at the end of 2024. The Turkish central bank actively utilises this London inventory to execute liquidity management, using large-scale gold-for-foreign currency swap arrangements to stabilise the Turkish lira and manage capital flows.

=== Venezuela ===
Before 2012, the Central Bank of Venezuela, Banco Central de Venezuela (BCV), held about 211 tonnes of its 365 tonnes of gold reserves in American, European, and Canadian banks. In January 2012, however, Venezuela completed the move of 160 tonnes of gold bars (valued at about $9 billion) back home. The operation was ordered by President Hugo Chávez in August 2011 and was overseen by Central Bank chair Nelson Merentes.

In early November 2018, the Bank of England in London refused the withdrawal of 14 tonnes of gold owned by the BCV at the request of top U.S. officials, including Secretary of State Michael Pompeo and National Security Adviser John Bolton, who lobbied their U.K. counterparts to help cut the government off from their overseas assets.

In August 2026, following a devastating series of earthquakes in Venezuela, the political impasse over the frozen assets saw a major breakthrough via US-mediated negotiations. The Delcy Rodríguez government and opposition leaders signed a joint agreement to release the 31 tonnes of gold from the Bank of England to finance humanitarian reconstruction efforts. Under the terms of the US-backed pact, the $4 billion in bullion is to be systematically liquidated and routed into managed accounts at the United States Treasury Department to enforce absolute financial containment. Disbursements from the account are explicitly restricted to infrastructure rebuilding under a permanent audit framework overseen by independent international firms.

== International custodial shifts ==
This section tracks sovereign gold reserve reallocations where a central bank has moved its assets away from traditional North American vaulting into alternative international trading hubs.

=== Netherlands ===
In 2014, 122.5 tonnes of Dutch gold reserves were returned to Amsterdam from New York, where they had been stored in a vault of the Federal Reserve Bank of New York; De Nederlandsche Bank, the Dutch central bank, said that it "felt that in times of financial crisis, it was better to have the gold near at hand."

On 2 September 2026, the Dutch central bank announced it had transferred 86 tonnes of gold reserves out of New York City and Ottawa to improve its "crisis preparedness" amid rising geopolitical unrest. To minimise physical transport risks and costs, the operation was executed using a combination of methods: 59 tonnes were relocated via location swap transactions (selling bullion in New York and repurchasing market-standard bars in London), while 27 tonnes were physically shipped from North America to the DNB Cash Centre in Zeist before a similar quantity was transferred to London. The operation reduced the share of Dutch reserves held in North America and increased the share held at the Bank of England to 32.1% to ensure the bullion remains highly liquid and tradable during a crisis. Following the rebalancing, the total size of the Dutch sovereign gold cache remains entirely unchanged at exactly 612.4 metric tonnes (valued at roughly €72.2 billion or $83.7 billion). The reallocation restructured the central bank's assets into roughly equal thirds across its primary geographic hubs, leaving 32.1% stored with the Bank of England, 30.8% held domestically in Zeist, and approximately 37.0% split equally at 18.5% each between the Federal Reserve Bank of New York and the Bank of Canada in Ottawa.

The resulting geographic distribution of the 612.4 tonnes of the Netherlands' gold reserves shifted as follows:

- Federal Reserve Bank of New York: Decreased from 31.3% to 18.5%
- Bank of Canada (Ottawa): Decreased from 19.7% to 18.5%
- Bank of England (London): Increased from 18.1% to 32.1%
- DNB Cash Centre (Zeist): Remained unchanged at 30.8%

== Legislative proposals and public debates ==
This section documents countries undergoing formal legislative initiatives, public referendums, or political debates regarding gold repatriation where no physical relocation of bullion has occurred.

=== Belgium ===
In a December 2014 interview with the Belgian broadcaster VTM Nieuws, Luc Coene, the governor of Belgium's central bank, confirmed that the bank was looking at how it could bring its gold reserves back into the country.

According to IMF data compiled by the World Gold Council, Belgium holds 227.4 tonnes of gold, representing 34.2% of its official foreign reserves. According to reports, most of the gold is held outside of the country with the Bank of England, the Bank of Canada and the Bank for International Settlements. Following an internal investigation into the logistical feasibility and security requirements of a repatriation, the National Bank of Belgium ultimately decided to keep its reserves abroad, concluding that building the necessary high-security infrastructure domestically would incur an unjustifiable cost of roughly €250,000 annually.

=== Italy ===
The Bank of Italy (Italian: Banca d'Italia) manages the third-largest sovereign gold reserve in the world, maintaining a massive stockpile of 2,451.8 metric tonnes of physical bullion that serves as a critical historical anchor for the nation's financial credibility and emergency economic resilience. The legal custody and strategic purpose of this reserve became the focus of intense domestic and international political debate between 2025 and 2026.

In June 2025, concerns over Italy's gold reserves held abroad intensified, with around 43% of its gold reportedly stored at the Federal Reserve Bank of New York. Italian economic commentator Enrico Grazzini called for the gold to be repatriated, describing its continued storage in the United States as a risk to Italy's national interest. In November that year, Italian lawmakers proposed declaring the Bank of Italy's 2,452 tonnes of gold reserves to be the property of the Italian state, amid debate over the ownership and potential use of the country's gold. As of May 2026, around 44% of Italy's gold was stored domestically, with a similar proportion held at the Federal Reserve Bank of New York, while the remainder was held in the United Kingdom and Switzerland.

The proposed ownership amendment was heavily criticised by the European Central Bank (ECB), which warned that transferring reserve title or liquidating the bullion to finance public spending would violate European Union treaties protecting central bank independence and the strict prohibition against state monetary financing. Following intense negotiations, the Italian Treasury and the ECB resolved the dispute by guaranteeing that the gold reserves would remain insulated from political spending under independent central bank administration. Concurrently, despite political pressure to follow other European states in physically reclaiming offshore bullion, the Bank of Italy formally confirmed that it would not pursue any physical gold repatriation operations, clarifying that maintaining its decentralised storage infrastructure remains the most effective policy for risk diversification and emergency crisis resilience.

=== Romania ===
In April 2019, the Romanian Parliament passed a legislative mandate requiring the National Bank of Romania (BNR) to repatriate 91.5% of its foreign-stored gold reserves, equivalent to approximately 56 tonnes of physical bullion. At the time of the bill's proposal, the BNR held roughly 60% of its total 103.7-tonne gold reserve in the vaults of the Bank of England in London. The legislation, initiated by members of the ruling Social Democratic Party, argued that Romania's domestic economic stability rendered offshore storage fees unjustifiable and that sovereign assets should be maintained within national borders.

The repatriation directive faced intense institutional and constitutional pushback, leading to a complete political deadlock. BNR Governor Mugur Isărescu and central bank officials strongly opposed the measure, arguing that maintaining bullion in a major liquid trading hub like London was crucial for maintaining the state's credit rating and ensuring the gold could be utilised instantly as financing collateral during a macroeconomic crisis.

Although the Constitutional Court of Romania rejected an opposition challenge in June 2019 and ruled the mandate constitutional, the implementation of the law was permanently stalled following the refusal of President Klaus Iohannis to promulgate the bill, alongside subsequent leadership changes within the government later that year. Consequently, the geographical distribution of Romania's gold reserves remained entirely unchanged.

=== Spain ===
In 2026, amid accelerating shifts in transatlantic relations and an emphasis on European Union strategic autonomy, academic economists and policy analysts began urging the Bank of Spain to initiate a formal repatriation program for its gold reserves held at the Federal Reserve Bank of New York. Proponents of the move argued that domestic custody would insulate the state's primary wealth from third-party geopolitical risks and regulatory shifts in Washington.

Although the total value of Spain’s gold reserves—amounting to approximately 281 tonnes (9 million troy ounces)—reached a record high of €94 billion due to the metal's rising price, the institution has chosen not to alter its strategy. Unlike the central banks of France or the Netherlands, which accelerated the removal of their holdings from U.S. custody, the Bank of Spain keeps the exact amount deposited in New York strictly confidential and is not considering plans to relocate the assets, reaffirming its confidence in the current storage infrastructure. While central bank officials continue to treat the current overseas storage architecture as secure, the widening institutional debate highlights the growing European questions over long-term reliance on U.S. custody and the strategic necessity of domestic asset protection.

=== Switzerland ===
Switzerland famously maintains one of the largest sovereign gold reserves in the world, historically anchoring its reputation for financial neutrality, fiscal stability, and independent monetary policy. In November 2014, Swiss voters roundly rejected a popular initiative titled "Save our Swiss Gold" by a decisive margin of 77.3%. The referendum, organised by members of the Swiss People's Party, sought to enshrine three constitutional constraints on the Swiss National Bank (SNB): a mandate to hold at least 20% of its assets in physical gold, a permanent ban on future gold sales, and the full repatriation of all sovereign gold reserves stored in foreign vaults. Both the SNB and the Swiss federal government strongly opposed the measure, arguing that a rigid gold quota and a ban on asset liquidation would severely compromise the central bank's monetary policy independence and currency stabilisation efforts.

Following the failure of the initiative, Switzerland's geographical gold allocation policy remained unchanged. Out of the SNB's total 1,040 tonnes of gold reserves, approximately 70% is held domestically within Switzerland, 20% is stored at the Bank of England, and the remaining 10% resides at the Bank of Canada.

== See also ==
- Fiat money
- Gold as an investment
- Gold standard
- Moscow gold
- Dedollarisation
