= Fovargue =

Fovargue is a surname of British, Irish and French origin.

== List of people with the surname ==
- Vincent Fovargue (1900–1921), British-Irish spy
- Walter Fovargue (1882–1963), American golfer, club maker and golf course architect
- Yvonne Fovargue (born 1956), British politician

== See also ==
- Fauvergue
- Forgues
- Favarger
