= Fauvergue =

Fauvergue is a surname.

== List of people with the surname ==
- Jean-Michel Fauvergue (born 1957), French politician
- Nicolas Fauvergue (born 1984), French professional footballer

== See also ==
- Fovargue
