= Favarger =

Swiss chocolate company

- Industry: Chocolate production
- Founded: 1826; 199 years ago in Geneva, Switzerland
- Founder: Jacques Foulquier
- Headquarters: Versoix, Switzerland
- Key people: Luka Rajic
- Website: favarger.com

Favarger is a Swiss chocolate making company founded by Jacques Foulquier in 1826 in Geneva. It is currently located in Versoix, Canton of Geneva, Switzerland.

== History ==
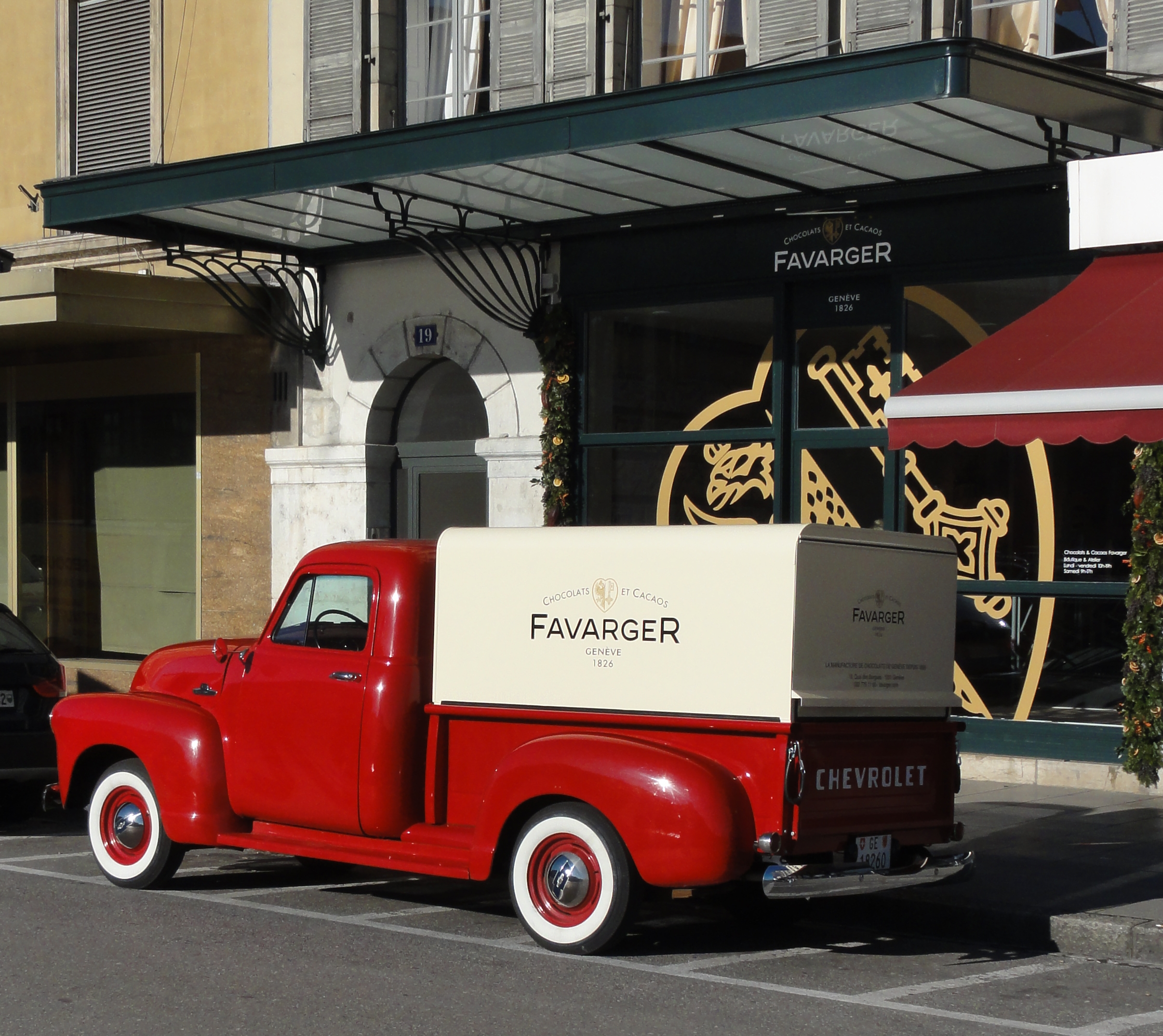
Favarger Antique Chevrolet Truck and the Boutique at Quai des Bergues in Geneva

In 1826, Jacques Foulquier, a confectioner, moved to Geneva and started a chocolate company. One of his daughters later married Jean-Samuel Favarger who took over his father in laws' company.

In 1878, the company relocated outside of Geneva, in Versoix, a small commune in the canton of Geneva. The location of the former chocolate factory is today's Batîment des Forces Motrices.

In 1922, the company created one of their signature chocolates called Avelines. The brick chocolates combine milk and dark chocolate with praline, almonds and Madagascan vanilla.

The Favarger family maintained ownership of the company until 2003 when the majority of shares were purchased by Luka Rajic. Rajic's goal was to blend the traditional expertise of Favarger as a chocolate specialist with his own managerial skills in order to expand the brand's presence both in Switzerland and internationally.

Favarger collaborated with the Goldkenn chocolate company from its launch in 1980 until 1995.

== See also ==
- List of bean-to-bar chocolate manufacturers
