= Save our Swiss Gold =

Save our Swiss Gold motion is a citizen movement that calls for the Swiss central bank to hold at least 20% of its assets in gold, prohibit selling any gold in future and bring back all its gold reserves to Switzerland.

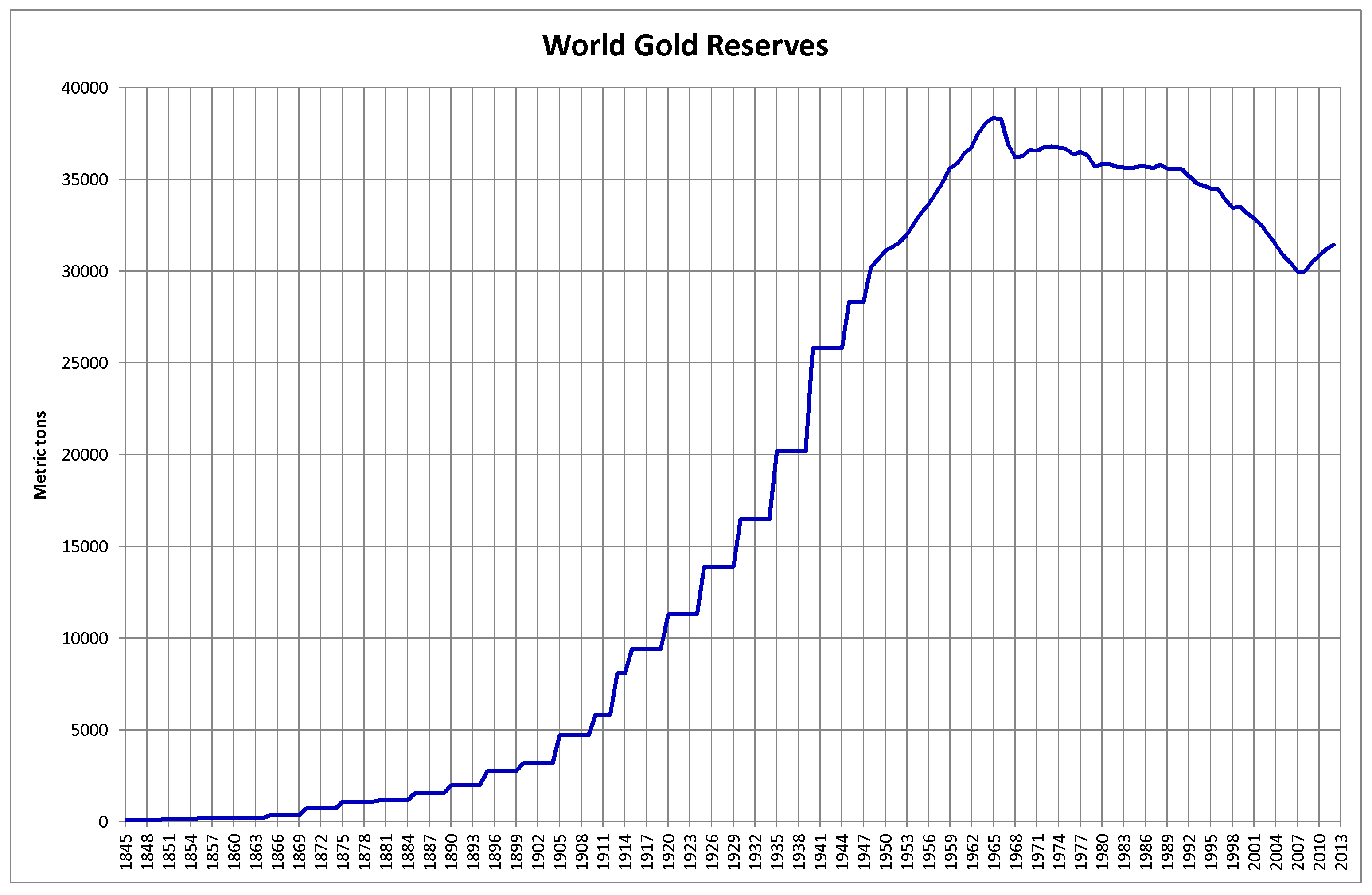
World Gold Reserves from 1845 to 2013, in tonnes (also known as metric tons in the United States)

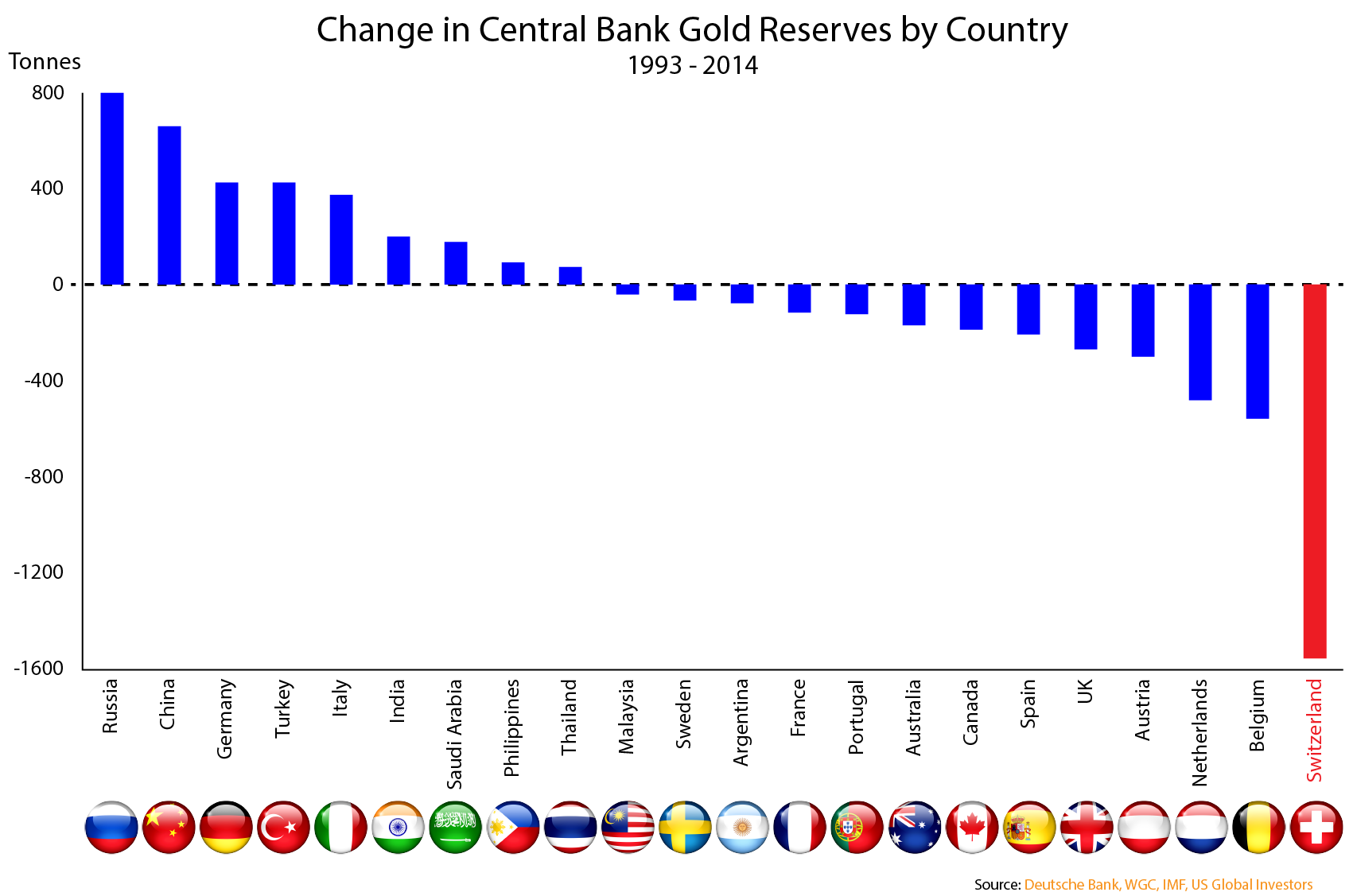
Changes in Central Bank Gold Reserves by Country 1993-2014. Switzerland sold three times more gold than any other country.

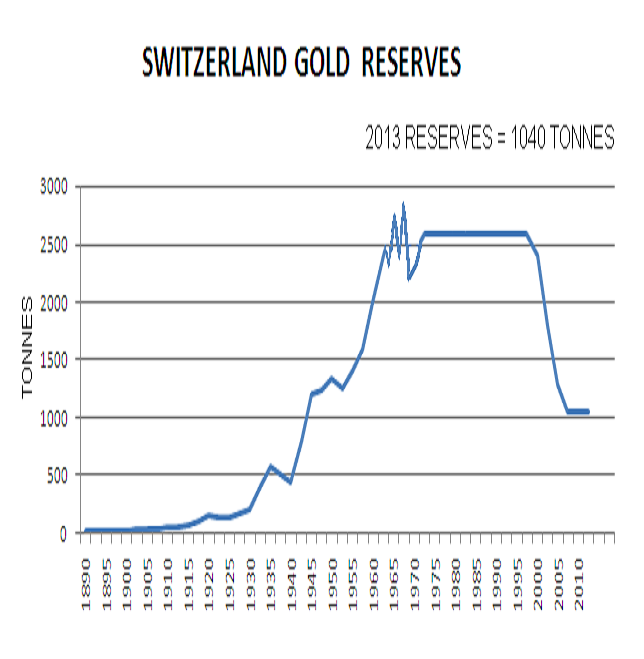
Drastic decline in Swiss gold reserves occurred during 1997- 2005

The Swiss government and the Swiss National Bank (SNB), however, do not agree with this citizen movement and stepped up efforts to block the motion that would force the country to almost triple the amount of its gold reserves. The group argue that gold is a barrier to devaluation of fiat paper currencies and that there is a key flaw in the system of floating paper currencies. The group argues that gold is a barrier to debasement of fiat currencies.

The movement was started by 3 Swiss People's Party politicians – Parliamentarians Luzi Stamm, Lukas Reimann and Ulrich Schlüer – the initiative to "Save Switzerland's gold" was handed in to the Federal Chancellery in 2013. A referendum under Switzerland's system of self-government requires 100,000 signatures to get on the ballot. 5 million Swiss voters could vote on the proposal, this referendum was held on 30 November 2014 and the result was no.

== See also ==
- 2014 Swiss referendums
- Gold reserve
- Gold as an investment
- Fiat currency
