= Jeffrey Sprecher =

American businessman (born 1955)

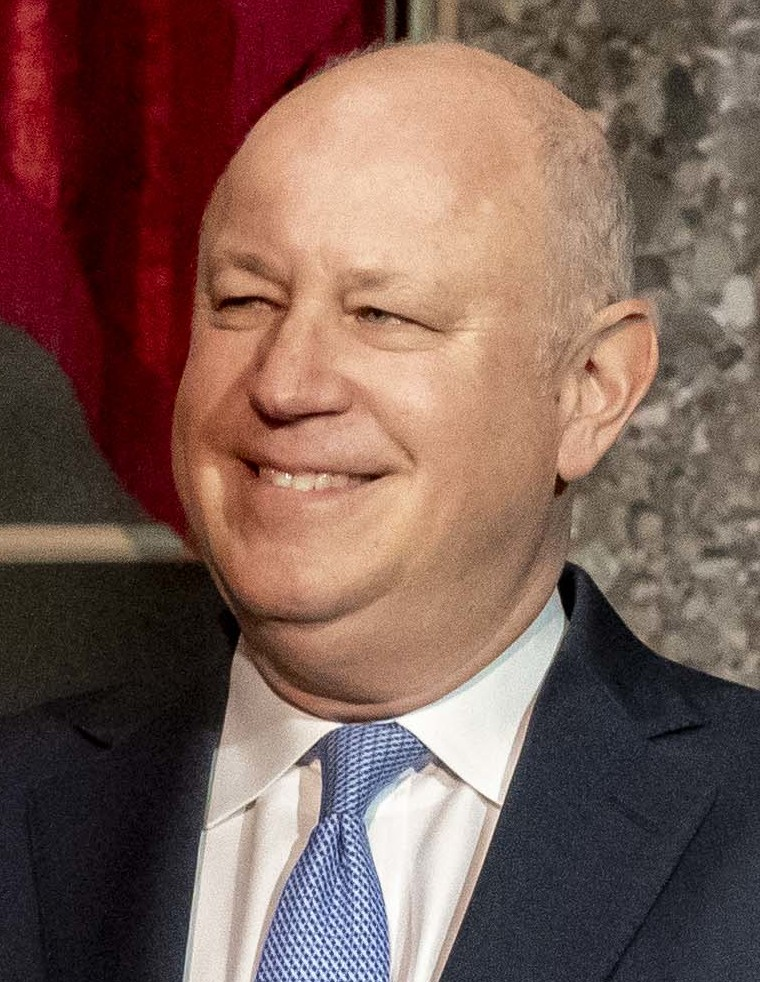
- Sprecher in 2020
- Born: Jeffrey Craig Sprecher; February 23, 1955 (age 71); Madison, Wisconsin, U.S.
- Education: University of Wisconsin–Madison (BS); Pepperdine University (MBA)
- Occupations: Chairman and CEO, Intercontinental Exchange; Chairman, New York Stock Exchange
- Spouse: Kelly Loeffler (m. 2004)

Jeffrey Craig Sprecher (/ˌsprɛkər/, SPREK-ər, born February 23, 1955) is an American businessman, the founder, chairman, and CEO of Intercontinental Exchange, and chairman of the New York Stock Exchange.

== Early life ==
Sprecher was born in Madison, Wisconsin, the son of insurance broker Peter Sprecher and medical technologist Phyllis (née Willingham). His sisters are the filmmakers Karen and Jill Sprecher. He attended Madison's James Madison Memorial High School, and was initiated to the Wisconsin Alpha Chapter of Sigma Alpha Epsilon. Sprecher received a bachelor's degree in chemical engineering from the University of Wisconsin–Madison in 1978 and a Master of Business Administration from Pepperdine University in 1984.

== Career ==
Sprecher's first job was at Trane, where he met William Prentice who was developing power plants following deregulation. Prentice offered him a job at Western Power Group in 1983.

The Energy Policy Act of 1992 passed and deregulation in the electric industry began. Those working in the "electric industry realized the need for real-time, continentwide transactions", made possible by "Continental Power Exchange" technologies whereby "individual businesses and consumers may one day be able to select an energy provider in the same way that individuals shop for long-distance telephone service."

In 1996 he bought the Continental Power Exchange in Atlanta from MidAmerican Energy Holdings Company for $1 plus the assumption of debt, which became the foundation for Intercontinental Exchange (ICE).

In the 1990s energy trading was handled manually by "Continental Power Exchange, an electronic energy trading company. By 1997 Continental Power Exchange CPEX had "a federated software structure in place, CPEX... ready to expand to more servers as growth demands. CPEX's hardware and server architecture [were] capable of supporting foreseeable changes that may be necessary when the client load arrives. Continental [intended] to stay at least one step ahead of the marketplace."

Sprecher started Intercontinental Exchange (ICE) in 2000 as an online marketplace for energy trading in Atlanta.

Shortly after the company approached Enron to be a client, Enron started its own competing electricity trading platform, which dominated the market. Enron's market model was to buy from every seller and sell to every buyer. Wall Street bankers, particularly Goldman Sachs and Morgan Stanley backed him and he launched ICE in 2000 (giving 80 percent control to the two banks who, in turn spread out the control among Shell, Total and BP). When Enron's exchange collapsed in 2001 in the Enron scandal, ICE's business exploded.

Since then the company has expanded including the following acquisitions:

- International Petroleum Exchange in 2001
- New York Board of Trade in 2006
- Creditex in 2008
- The Clearing Corporation in 2009
- Climate Exchange in 2010
- NYSE Euronext in 2013
- In November 2013, ICE announced its acquisition of Singapore Mercantile Exchange
- SuperDerivatives in 2014
- Interactive Data Corporation in 2015

=== Bakkt ===
In 2018, Intercontinental Exchange formed Bakkt, “a pioneering marketplace in digital currency futures.” In January 2021, the company announced that “Bakkt’s being absorbed into a special purpose acquisition company (SPAC) sponsored by Chicago investment fund Victory Park Capital.” Sprecher was quoted in Fortune that “the lofty costs of processing payments by credit card [are] one of the prime targets for disruption in financial services. Bakkt . . . could play a central role in wrestling down costs.”

=== Stock sales during COVID-19 pandemic ===
On March 19, 2020, the public release of federal financial-disclosure documents revealed that Sprecher and his wife, interim U.S. Senator Kelly Loeffler sold millions of dollars of stock the couple owned in companies vulnerable to the COVID-19 pandemic. The sales began the same day Loeffler and other senators received a private briefing from federal officials about the looming crisis. The documents also showed that the couple purchased stock in Citrix Systems, a company that would potentially benefit from the increase in remote work due to the stay-at-home orders issued to mitigate the COVID-19 pandemic. At least some of the stocks that Loeffler sold were owned jointly with Sprecher and would have required his knowledge and authorization to sell, documents show.

On March 20, 2020, the consumer advocacy group Common Cause filed complaints against Sprecher and Loeffler with the Securities and Exchange Commission, the United States Senate Ethics Committee, and the United States Justice Department, requesting from the latter a criminal investigation of the couple for violations of the STOCK Act.

On March 20, 2020, also reported by CNBC in the same article referenced above, Intercontinental Exchange said in a statement that the nearly 30 transactions involving the couple were “in compliance” with company policies. “Mr. Sprecher and Senator Loeffler have made clear that those transactions were executed by their financial advisors without Mr. Sprecher’s or Senator Loeffler’s input or direction.”

On June 16, 2020, it was reported that the Senate Ethics Committee ended its investigation into Sen. Kelly Loeffler's stock trades. The news came three weeks after Sen. Loeffler's office said the Justice Department had also dropped its probe into her stock trades. Deborah Sue Mayer, the Ethics Committee's chief counsel and staff director, wrote in the letter that the panel examined stock transactions made by both Loeffler and her husband Jeffrey Sprecher, chairman of the New York Stock Exchange.

=== Lobbying and political influence ===
In October 2025, Sprecher and his wife Kelly Loeffler were among the donors who funded the White House's East Wing demolition, and planned building of a ballroom.

== Personal life ==
Sprecher has been married to former U.S. senator Kelly Loeffler since 2004. They reside in Tuxedo Park, Atlanta in a $10,500,000, 15,000 square foot estate named Descante, though the property was later reappraised for around $4 million, resulting in far lower property taxes.

During the COVID-19 pandemic, Sprecher and his wife donated $1 million to the Phoebe Foundation's COVID-19 Relief Fund of the Phoebe Putney Health System for personal protective equipment for Phoebe care team members.

During the first half of 2025, Sprecher and his wife each donated $2.5 million to MAGA Inc., a super PAC that supports Donald Trump.
