= Brent Crude =

Classification of crude oil that serves as a major worldwide benchmark price

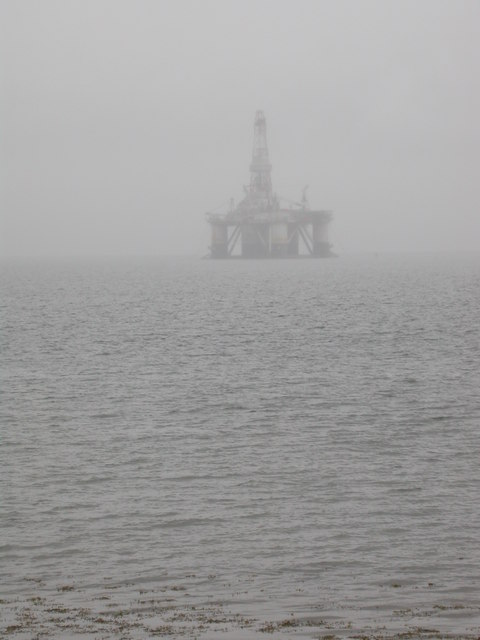
An oil platform in the North Sea

Brent Crude is the world's most widely used benchmark for the price of crude oil. The term can be used in three ways. First, to refer to a trading classification—a specific quality or type of crude oil. Brent Crude is light—it has low density, yielding high volumes of petrol and diesel after refinement; and sweet—it contains low levels of sulphur, which makes it easy to refine. Secondly, the term 'Brent Crude' can be used to refer to a geographical source—the Brent oilfield and oilfields in the British North Sea, where the benchmark and trading classification take their names from. Lastly, in finance, the term 'Brent Crude' colloquially refers to a standardised futures contract for Brent Crude Oil bought and sold in the Intercontinental Exchange (ICE).

The significance of the benchmark lies in its role in pricing other varieties of crude oil. Most of the world's oil, including West African, Mediterranean, Russian, and Brazilian varieties, is priced by reference to Dated Brent, a price benchmark assessment index compiled daily by S&P Global Platts and other agencies. When trading different grades of crude, traders agree a 'price differential' (either a discount or a premium, depending on the quality of oil) set by reference to Dated Brent. Along with West Texas Intermediate (WTI), Brent Crude is one of two commercial benchmarks for establishing the prices of crude oil.

== History ==
Until the late 1970s, most oil was not traded in a free market, but rather at prices set or agreed upon by states and producers. In the aftermath of the 1973 oil crisis, and as a result of the repeated inability of OPEC to set and maintain crude oil prices, it became accepted that oil trade between Middle Eastern producers and U.S., East Asian and European companies would have to move to a different system which would reflect prices on internationally traded oil markets. In the late-1980s, the main U.S. oil companies (Exxon, Mobil, Chevron and Texaco) and Aramco reached an agreement to move towards a pricing system based on international benchmarks, such as Brent Crude and West Texas Intermediate. From then, international oil markets moved towards pricing based on 'price differentials' between benchmarks and specific supplies of crude oil. At that point, Brent-sourced oil already traded under a market-based pricing system, owing to the privatisation and liberalisation policies introduced in British petroleum trade in the early 1980s by Margaret Thatcher. As such, Brent Crude emerged as a particularly attractive benchmark for trade of oil into Europe.

Although the name 'Brent Crude' is eponymous to the Brent oilfield in the UK, where it was first extracted in 1976, production in the Brent field ceased in 2021, and had declined steeply in the 1990s. To ensure that the benchmark reflected a competitive price unaffected by constrained supply, the agencies compiling the benchmark expanded the Brent Crude classification by allowing oil from other sources to 'stand in' for Brent oil. At first, the reference was broadened by adding other North Sea sources: the Forties and Oseberg oil fields were added in 2002, followed by the Ekofisk oil field in 2007, and the Troll oil field in 2018. Together, this 'basket' of crudes is known as the BFOET Quotation. Most recently, the benchmark came to include petroleum from Midland, Texas, added in 2023.

== Brent Complex ==
In finance, the term Brent crude refers to the prices of oil futures traded in the Intercontinental Exchange:

- Brent crude oil monthly futures contracts
- Brent crude oil monthly forward contracts
- Brent crude oil weekly Contract-for-Difference (CFD)
- Dated Brent short-term assessed prices
- Brent-Forties-Oseberg-Ekofisk-Troll_WTI (BFOETI), Dated Brent, or Brent spot-market
- Brent oilfield crude oil blend
- ICE Brent Index

The Brent Complex facilitates the buying-and-selling of Brent crude oil, gathers data of the prices of the transactions (forward contract, CFD, Dated Brent), establishes reference-prices for other petroleum transactions (Dated Brent assessed prices, Dated BFOET assessed prices, forward traded-prices, futures traded-prices), and transfers the risk-of-loss of such transactions (via hedging in the forward markets and in the futures markets).

== Brent crude oil futures contracts ==
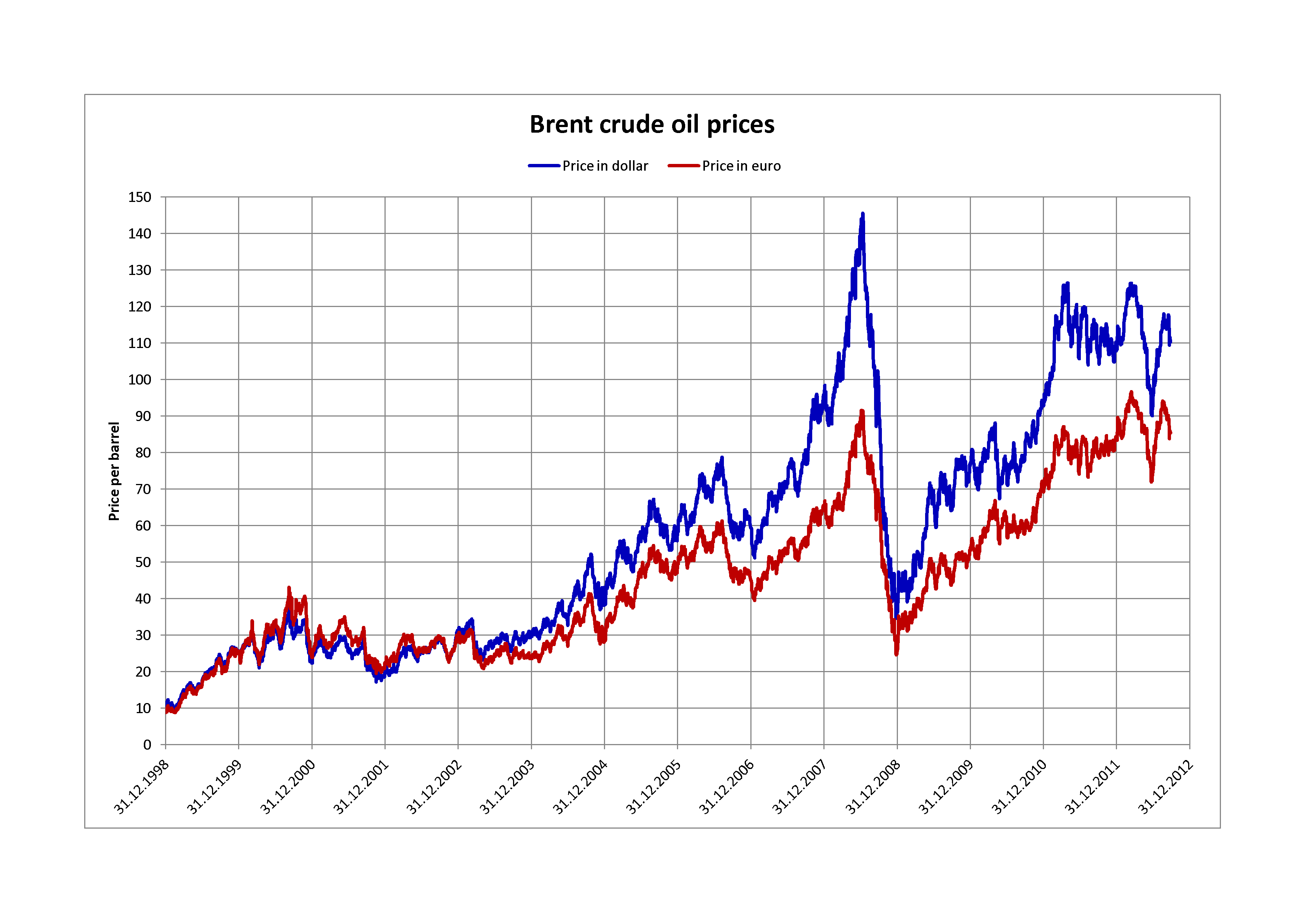
Brent crude oil prices, in dollars and euros, 1998 to 2012

=== ICE Brent crude oil futures ===
The ICE Futures Europe symbol for Brent crude oil futures is B. It was originally traded on the open outcry International Petroleum Exchange in London starting in 1988, but since 2005 has been traded on the electronic Intercontinental Exchange, known as ICE. One contract equals 1,000 barrels (159 m^{3}) and quoted in U.S. dollars. Up to 96 contracts, for 96 consecutive months, in the Brent crude oil futures contract series are available for trading. For example, before the last trading date for May 2020, 96 contracts, from contracts for May 2020, June 2020, July 2020 ... Mar 2028, April 2028, and May 2028 are available for trading. ICE Clear Europe acts as the central counterparty for Brent crude oil and related contracts. Brent contracts are deliverable contracts based on 'Exchange of Futures for Physicals' (EFP) delivery with an option to cash settle against the ICE Brent Index price for the last trading day of the futures contract.

=== CME Brent crude oil futures ===
In addition to ICE, two types of Brent crude financial futures are also traded on the NYMEX (now part of the Chicago Mercantile Exchange (CME)). They are ultimately priced in relation to the ICE Brent crude oil futures and the ICE Brent Index.

Brent Crude Oil Penultimate Financial Futures, also known as Brent Crude Oil Futures, are traded using the symbol BB, and are cash settled based on the ICE Brent Crude Oil Futures 1st nearby contract settlement price on the penultimate trading day for the delivery month.

Brent Last Day Financial Futures, also known as Brent Crude Oil Financial Futures, are traded using the symbol BZ, and are cash settled based on the ICE Brent Crude Oil Index price as published one day after the final trading day for the delivery month.

=== Role in hedging ===
Although price discovery for the Brent Complex is driven in the Brent forward market, many hedgers and traders prefer to use futures contracts like the ICE Brent futures contract to avoid the risk of large physical deliveries. If the market participant is using Brent futures to hedge physical oil transactions based on Dated Brent, they will still face basis risk between Dated Brent and EFP prices. Hedgers could use a Crude Diff or 'Dated to Front Line' (DFL) contract, which is a spread contract between Dated Brent and Brent 1st Line Future (the front month future), to hedge the basis risk. So a complete hedge would be the relevant Brent futures contract, and a DFL contract when the futures contract becomes the front month future. This is equivalent to a Brent forward contract and a CFD contract in forward contract terms.

=== Price difference with WTI ===
The spot price of West Texas Intermediate in relation to the price of Brent Crude

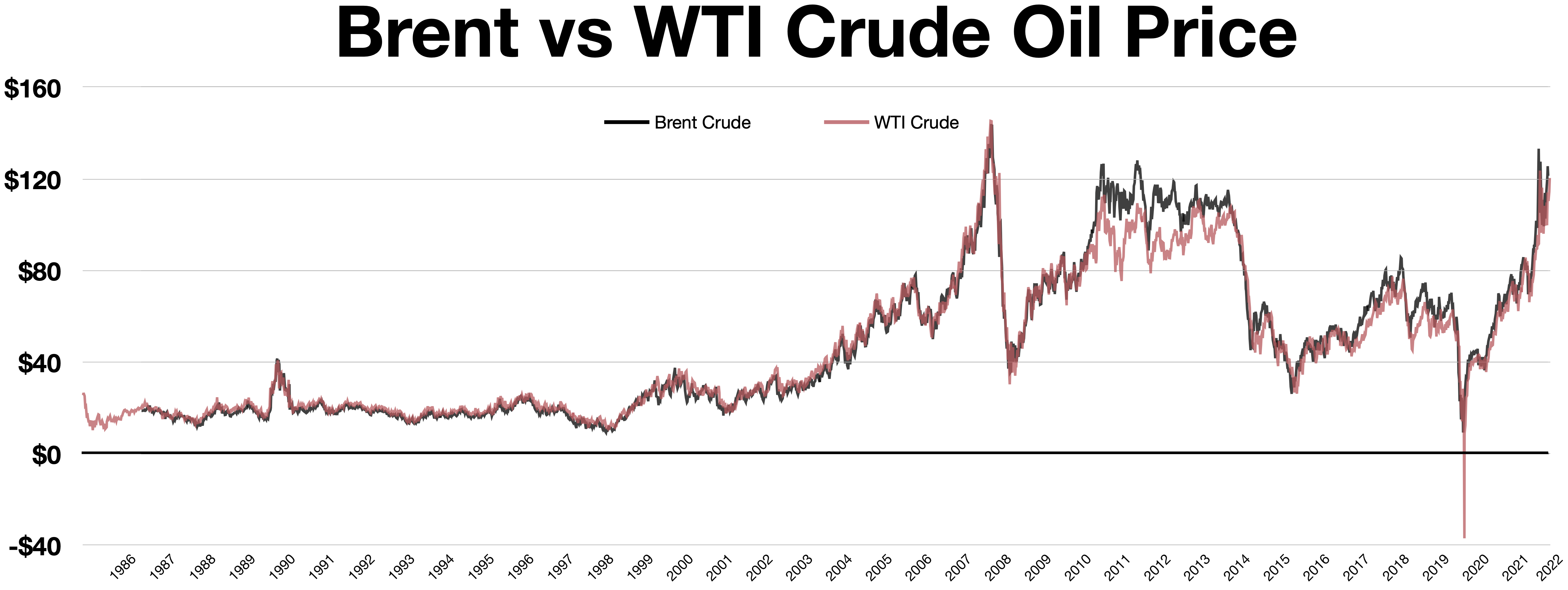
Brent Crude West Texas Intermediate

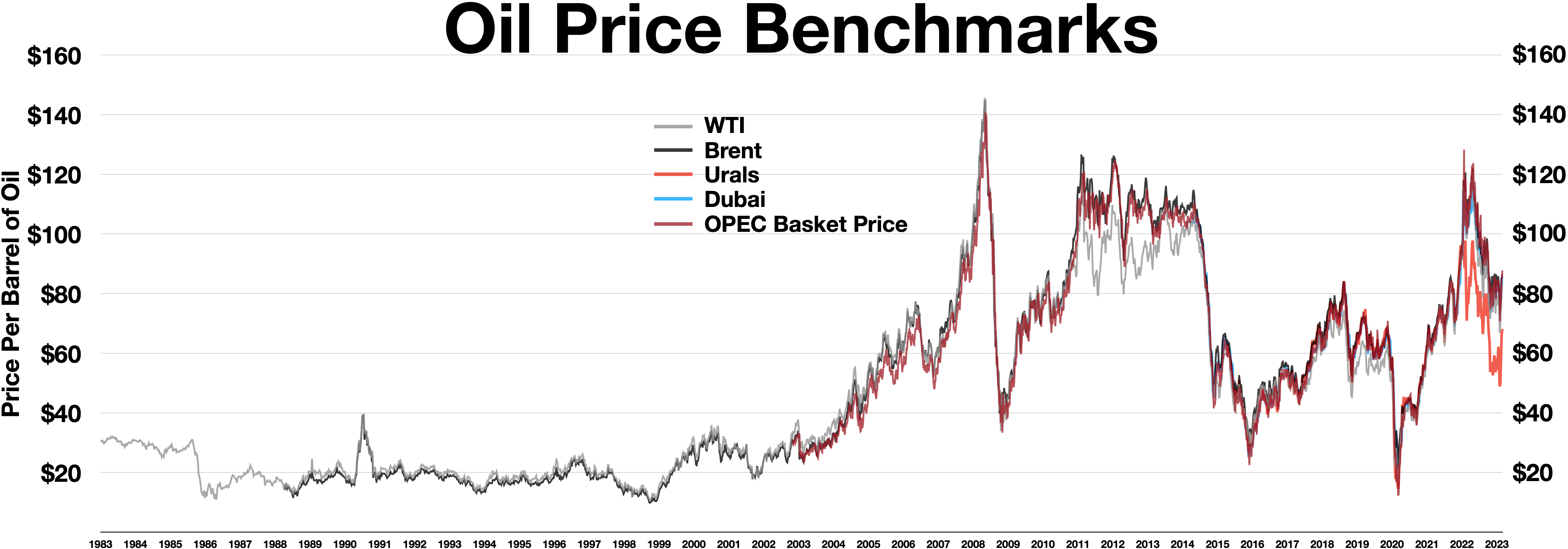
West Texas Intermediate Brent Crude Urals oil (Russian export mix) Dubai Crude OPEC Reference Basket

Historically, price differences between Brent and other index crudes have been based on physical differences in crude oil specifications and short-term variations in supply and demand. Prior to September 2010, there existed a typical price difference per barrel of between ±3 USD/bbl compared to WTI and OPEC Basket; however, since the autumn of 2010 Brent has been priced much higher than WTI, reaching a difference of more than $11 a barrel by the end of February 2011 (WTI: US$104/bbl, LCO: US$116/bbl).

In February 2011 the divergence reached $16 during a supply glut, record stockpiles, at Cushing, Oklahoma before peaking at above $23 in August 2012. It has since (September 2012) decreased significantly to around $18 after refinery maintenance settled down and supply issues eased slightly.

Many reasons have been given for this divergence ranging from regional demand variations, to the depletion of the North Sea oil fields.

The US Energy Information Administration attributes the price spread between WTI and Brent to an oversupply of crude oil in the interior of North America (WTI price is set at Cushing, Oklahoma) caused by rapidly increasing oil production from unconventional reservoirs such as Canadian oil sands and tight oil formations such as the Bakken Formation, Niobrara Formation, and Eagle Ford Formation. Oil production in the interior of North America has exceeded the capacity of pipelines to carry it to markets on the Gulf Coast and east coast of North America; as a result, the oil price on the US and Canadian east coast and parts of the US Gulf Coast since 2011 has been set by the price of Brent Crude, while markets in the interior still follow the WTI price. Much US and Canadian crude oil from the interior is now shipped to the coast by railroad, which is much more expensive than pipeline.

=== April 2020 WTI negative pricing and Brent vulnerability ===
On April 20, 2020, the CME WTI futures contract for May 2020 settled at minus US$37.63 a barrel due to oil demand shocks from the COVID-19 pandemic, and to dwindling storage capacity at the futures contract delivery point at Cushing, Oklahoma. Brent settled for US$26.21 at the same time, for a difference of $63.84. While the oil demand shock and limited storage capacity affects both WTI and Brent futures contracts, Brent contracts have greater access to storage, and greater buffers to absorb demand shocks than the WTI contracts.

Brent futures contracts could theoretically access the storage capacity of all the shore tanks in North West Europe and of available shipping storage, while CME WTI contracts are restricted to storage and pipeline capacity at Cushing only. Brent futures contracts are traded in relation with Dated Brent and other contracts in the Brent Complex, allowing other contracts in the system to absorb demand shocks.

Up to April 20, most of the demand shock from the COVID-19 pandemic has been absorbed by Dated Brent contracts and Dated Brent quality differentials, which spared pricing pressure on Brent futures contracts. While Brent is more insulated to negative pricing by these factors than WTI, negative prices are still possible should oil demand and storage capacity fall further.

=== 2026 Strait of Hormuz disruption ===
In 2026, disruptions to shipping through the Strait of Hormuz affected the supply of Brent-linked crude oil to the international market. Before the disruption, around 20 million barrels per day of crude oil and petroleum products passed through the strait, representing roughly one-quarter of global seaborne oil trade. Average flows subsequently fell to about 2.7 million barrels per day during March, April and May. However, the conflict currently restricted through the waterway, which carries about one fifth of global oil supply.

The reduction in Middle Eastern exports coincided with higher Brent prices and declining global inventories. Brent settled above US$100 per barrels in September, while observed global oil inventories had fallen by approximately 507 million barrels between February and August. Governments responded by releasing oil from emergency reserves. International Energy Agency members agreed in March to make 400 million barrels available, while G7 countries announced a further release of 100 million barrels of crude oil and petroleum products in October.

== Brent crude oil monthly forward contracts ==
Brent crude oil monthly forward contracts started trading in 1983 as "open" contracts, or contracts that specify delivery month but not the delivery date. From 1983 to 1985, these contracts were for 500,000 barrels of Brent Blend crude, and were increased to 600,000 barrels after 1985. Deals were made bilaterally between two parties by telephone and confirmed by telex. Payment for deals were made 30 days after oil delivery. Since deals were bilateral and not centrally cleared like futures transactions, parties to the deal sought financial guarantees such as letters of credit to minimize counterparty credit risk. Contracts for one and two months forward were available in 1983, contracts for three months forward were available in 1984, contracts for four months forward were available in 1985, and contracts for at least four months are available for trading today.

Sellers of Brent forward contracts initially had to give buyers a notice of at least 15 days of intention to deliver. More recently, the notice period has expanded to 10 days to one month ahead. This shifted the front month of the Brent forward contract. For example, on May 4, the Front Month forward contract (also known as M1) is the July contract, the Second Month (M2) contract is the August contract, and the Third Month (M3) contract is the September contract.

Producers and refiners buy and sell oil on the market for wholesale trade, hedging, and tax purposes. Producers without integrated refinery operations, and vice versa for refiners without oil production, had to sell oil and could hedge oil price risk with forward contracts. Integrated oil producers (those with refinery operations) had the same motives, but had an extra incentive to lower taxes. Integrated oil producers faced taxes when transferring oil internally from production to refining operations. This practice became less prevalent with the introduction of tougher regulations in 1987.

These taxes are calculated based on a reference price originally set by BNOC and eventually calculated as a 30-day price average of spot prices before an oil transaction. Forward market prices tended to be lower than these reference prices a lot of the times, and integrated oil producers could profitably lower their tax obligations by selling oil on the forward market from their production operations, and buying back oil from unrelated parties for their refining operations on the same market. This practice became less prevalent with the introduction of tougher regulations in 1987.

Speculators became bilateral intermediaries between producers and refiners, and speculative deals came to dominate the forward market. Since there was no central clearing of those forward contracts, speculators who bought Brent forwards at the time and who do not want to take delivery of physical oil must find other parties to take the oil, and long chains of speculators formed between producers and refiners for every cargo of oil traded. Integrated oil producers also blurred the lines between commercial and speculative activity, as they could re-direct physical oil cargoes, and choose which forward contracts to deliver and which contracts to pass on to other speculators or producers.

Front Month Brent forward contracts prices came to be used as reference prices for spot transactions, but became vulnerable to speculative squeezes. The development of a Dated Brent and Forward Month Brent Contracts-for-Difference market increased this vulnerability, and market participants gradually switched to using Dated Brent as the spot transaction reference price by 1988.

== Brent crude oil contract-for-difference (CFD) ==
Brent crude oil contract-for-difference (CFD) is a weekly spread or swap between the Dated Brent assessed price and the Second Month (or M2) Brent crude oil forward contract. They trade over a five-day work week in volumes of 100 or 100,000 lots and the most recent CFD rolls to the next-week CFD on Thursday. The CFD market developed in 1988 in response to basis risk between the Brent futures/forward contract prices and the spot/dated Brent prices.

== Dated Brent assessed prices and the Brent spot market ==
In contrast to open forward contracts, Brent crude oil "dated" contracts – known as dated Brent contracts – specify the delivery date of crude in the current month in the spot market. Spot market transactions are generally not public, so market participants usually analyzed Dated Brent prices using assessments from Price Reporting Agencies (PRAs), who collect private transactions data and aggregate them. The important PRAs for the Brent Complex are Platts, Argus, and ICIS. Platts dominates the assessed Dated Brent price, Argus publishes a BFOET assessed crude price called Argus North Sea Dated crude price, and ICIS provides the final settlement data to the ICE Brent Index (which ultimately settles ICE Brent futures) since 2015.

However, in the early 1990s, Brent and BFOET crude spot markets started to price transactions using assessed Dated Brent prices as benchmark prices, which created a feedback loop that diluted fundamental supply and demand information contained in the assessed Dated Brent price, and created incentives for speculative squeezes.

Platts and other PRAs got around the problem by quoting both a dated Brent assessed on outright spot market transactions, and a "North Sea Date Brent Strip" assessed using a Front Month Brent forward price curve created out of adding the Brent Front Month contract price and relevant weekly Brent contracts-for-difference (CFD) prices. These dated Brent prices became less vulnerable to speculative squeezes, since market actors who try to corner the spot market will find that other market participants can sell on the front month forward market or on prices referenced to a front month forward market price, and market actors who try to monopolize the front month forward market will find that they would lose what they earned in the forward market in the spot market, as price effect they created in the front month contract will pass on to the dated Brent prices.

Platt's compile their assessment prices during price assessment 'windows', or specific times of market trading, usually close to the end of trading for a particular day. Trading in these windows are dominated by group of major market participants, as listed in the table below.

Trading activity in the Platt's price assessment ‘window’ by participant from 2016 to May 16, 2019
| Rank | Brent BFOET Forwards | | Rank | CFDs | |
|---|---|---|---|---|---|
| 1 | Shell International Trading and Shipping Company | 16.47% | 1 | Vitol SA | 11.83% |
| 2 | Vitol SA | 11.62% | 2 | Gunvor SA | 11.04% |
| 3 | Glencore Commodities Ltd. | 10.01% | 3 | BP Oil International | 9.99% |
| 4 | Gunvor SA | 10.57% | 4 | Mercuria Energy Trading SA | 9.86% |
| 5 | Hartree Partners, LP | 9.80% | 5 | Shell International Trading and Shipping Company | 8.19% |
| 6 | Mercuria Energy Trading SA | 9.37% | 6 | China Oil & Petroineos | 8.59% |
| 7 | SOCAR Trading UK Limited | 8.94% | 7 | Statoil ASA | 7.67% |
| | Others | 23.24% | | Others | 32.84% |
| | Total | 100.00% | | Total | 100.00% |

== Brent oilfield crude oil blend ==
Originally Brent Crude was produced from the Brent Oilfield. The name "Brent" comes from the naming policy of Shell UK Exploration and Production, operating on behalf of ExxonMobil and Royal Dutch Shell, which originally named all of its fields after birds (in this case the brent goose). But it is also a backronym or mnemonic for the formation layers of the oil field: Broom, Rannoch, Etive, Ness and Tarbert.

Petroleum production from Europe, Africa, and the Middle East flowing West tends to be priced relative to this oil, i.e. it forms a benchmark. The other well-known classifications (also called references or benchmarks) are the OPEC Reference Basket, Dubai Crude, Oman Crude, Shanghai Crude, Urals oil and West Texas Intermediate (WTI).

=== Characteristics ===
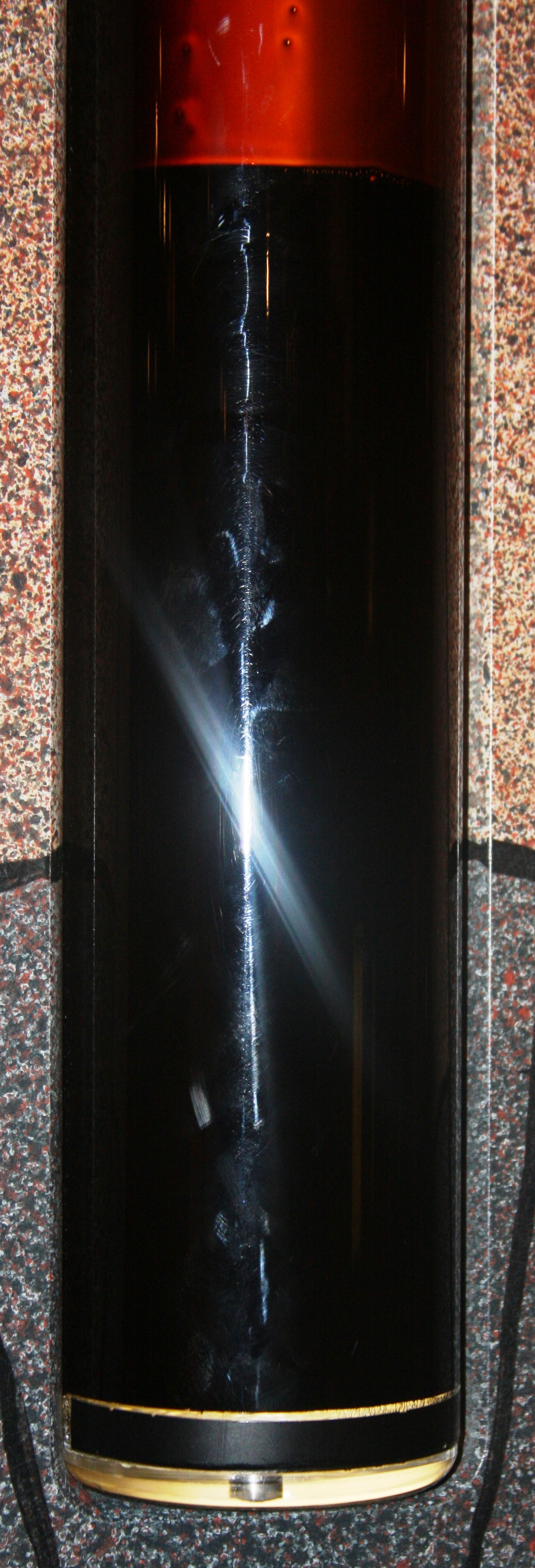
Oil from Ekofisk

Brent blend is a light crude oil (LCO), though not as light as West Texas Intermediate (WTI). It contains approximately 0.37% of sulphur, classifying it as sweet crude, yet not as sweet as WTI. Brent is suitable for production of petrol and middle distillates. It is typically refined in Northwest Europe.

Brent Crude has a density of approximately 835 kg/m^{3}, being equivalent to a specific gravity of 0.835 or an API gravity of 38.06.

== Brent Index ==
The Brent Index is the cash settlement price for the Intercontinental Exchange (ICE) Brent Future based on ICE Futures Brent index at expiry.

The index represents the average price of trading in the 25-day Brent Blend, Forties, Oseberg, Ekofisk (BFOE) market in the relevant delivery month as reported and confirmed by the industry media. Only published cargo size (600,000 barrels (95,000 m^{3})) trades and assessments are taken into consideration.

The index is calculated as an average of the following elements:

1. A weighted average of first month cargo trades in the 25-day BFOE market.
2. A weighted average of second month cargo trades in the 25-day BFOE market plus or minus a straight average of the spread trades between the first and second months.
3. A straight average of designated assessments published in media reports.

== See also ==
- List of crude oil products
- Petrobourse
- Petroeuro
