= Ellie Mae =

Mortgage technology company

Ellie Mae, Inc.
- Company type: Subsidiary
- Industry: Technology – Application Software
- Founded: 1997; 29 years ago
- Fate: Acquired by Intercontinental Exchange
- Headquarters: Pleasanton, California, U.S.
- Key people: Joe Tyrrell (President)
- Services: Automated solutions for the residential mortgage industry
- Revenue: ▲US$417.04 million (2017)
- Operating income: ▼US$42.14 million (2017)
- Net income: ▲US$52.85 million (2017)
- Total assets: ▲US$831.61 million (2017)
- Total equity: ▲US$735.34 million (2017)
- Owner: Intercontinental Exchange
- Number of employees: approx. 1,750 (2020)
- Website: ICEMortgageTechnology.com

Ellie Mae Inc., originally named Electronic Mortgage Affiliates, is a software company that processes 35% of U.S. mortgage applications. The services are based on a software as a service model (SaaS), and specializes in originating and funding new mortgage loans and facilitating regulatory compliance. The company is headquartered in Pleasanton, California.

== History ==
Ellie Mae was founded in 1997 by Limin Hu and Sigmund Anderman.

In 2009, Ellie Mae was accused by DocMagic, a competitor, of violating antitrust and intellectual property laws around actions taken when the vendor agreement between the two companies expired. The two companies settled the lawsuit after three years of litigation.

Ellie Mae made its initial public offering in 2011, valued at approximately $122 million.

== Mergers and Acquisitions ==
Ellie Mae acquired the assets of Online Document Systems Inc. (2008), Mavent Inc. (2009), Del Mar DataTrac (2011), Mortgage Pricing Systems (2011), MortgageCEO (2014), AllRegs (2014), ARG Interactive (2014), MortgageReturns (2015), Velocify (2017), Docvelocity (2019), and Capsilon (2019)

In April 2019, Ellie Mae was acquired by Thoma Bravo, LLC, a private equity investment firm, in an all-cash transaction that valued Ellie Mae at an aggregate equity value of approximately $3.7 billion. The acquisition was announced on February 12, 2019, and closed on April 17, 2019.

In August 2020, Intercontinental Exchange announced that it had entered into a definitive agreement to acquire Ellie Mae for approximately $11 billion. The transaction completed successfully in September 2020 after regulatory approval.
