= Kelly Loeffler =

American businesswoman and politician (born 1970)

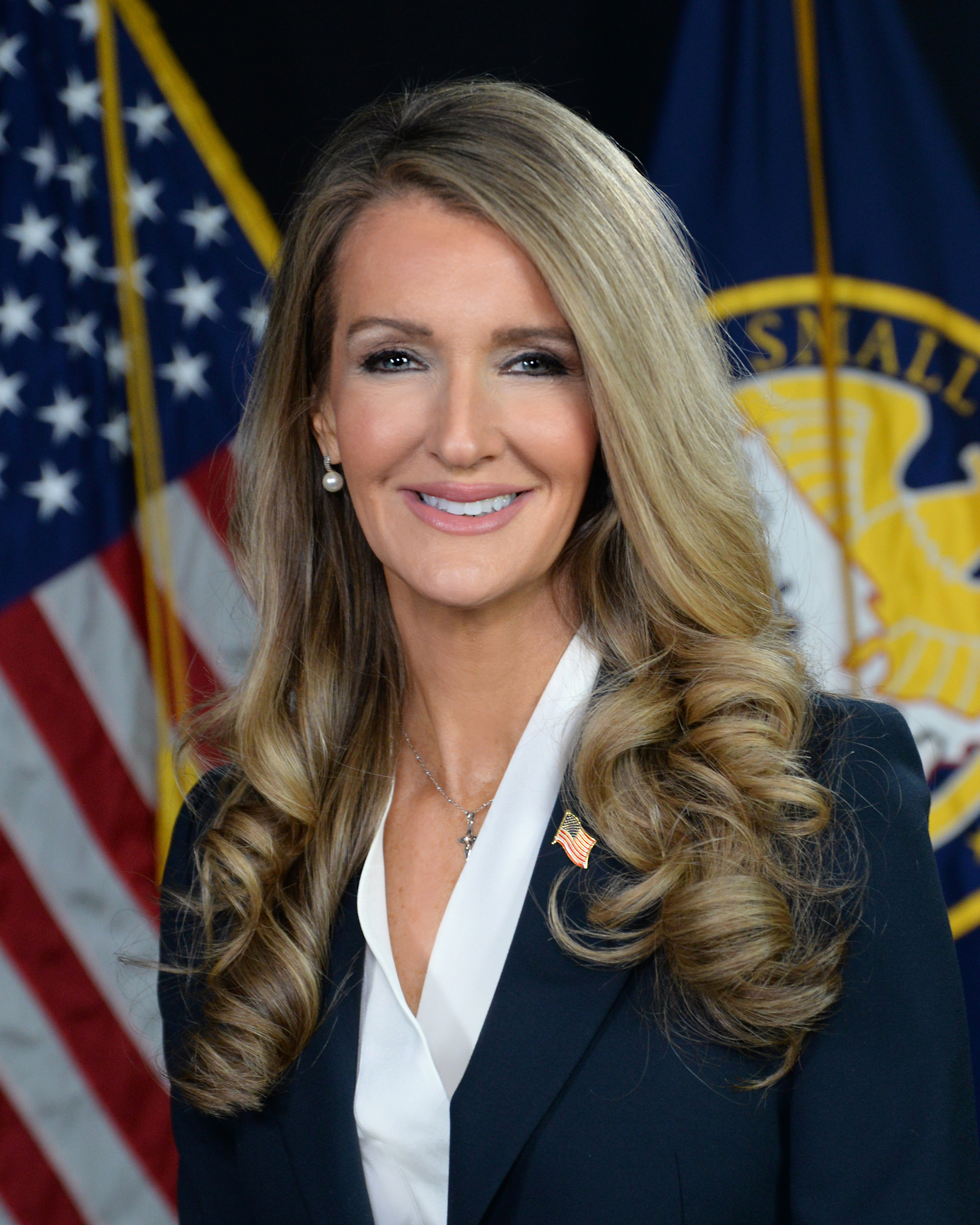
- Official portrait, 2025

28th Administrator of the Small Business Administration
- Incumbent
- Assumed office February 20, 2025
- President: Donald Trump
- Deputy: Bill Briggs
- Preceded by: Isabel Guzman

United States Senator from Georgia
- In office January 6, 2020 – January 20, 2021
- Appointed by: Brian Kemp
- Preceded by: Johnny Isakson
- Succeeded by: Raphael Warnock

Personal details
- Born: Kelly Lynn Loeffler; November 27, 1970 (age 55) Bloomington, Illinois, U.S.
- Party: Republican
- Spouse: Jeffrey Sprecher (m. 2004)
- Education: University of Illinois Urbana-Champaign (BS); DePaul University (MBA)
- Loeffler's voice Loeffler on American exceptionalism. Recorded July 1, 2020

Kelly Lynn Loeffler (/ˈlɛflər/ LEF-lər; born November 27, 1970) is an American businesswoman and politician who has served since February 2025 as the 28th administrator of the Small Business Administration. A member of the Republican Party, she served as a United States senator from Georgia from 2020 to 2021.

Loeffler was formerly the chief executive officer (CEO) of Bakkt, a subsidiary of commodity and financial service provider Intercontinental Exchange, of which her husband, Jeffrey Sprecher, is CEO. She is a former co-owner of the Atlanta Dream of the Women's National Basketball Association (WNBA).

Brian Kemp, the Republican governor of Georgia, appointed Loeffler to the U.S. Senate in December 2019 after Senator Johnny Isakson resigned for health reasons. Loeffler proved a consistent ally of President Donald Trump on key votes during her time in the U.S. Senate. Loeffler ran in the 2020 Georgia U.S. Senate special election, seeking to hold the seat until January 2023. She finished in the top two in the November 3 election, advancing to a runoff with Democrat Raphael Warnock held on January 5, 2021, which she lost. After the November 2020 election, Loeffler claimed that there had been unspecified failures in the 2020 U.S. presidential election. She later announced her intention to object to the certification of the Electoral College results in Congress. Loeffler ultimately withdrew her objection and voted for certification in January 2021.

On December 4, 2024, Trump announced he would nominate Loeffler to be administrator of the Small Business Administration during his second presidency. On February 19, 2025, Loeffler was confirmed to the position by the Senate.

== Early life and education ==
Kelly Lynn Loeffler was born on November 27, 1970, in Bloomington, Illinois, to Don and Lynda (née Munsell) Loeffler, and raised on her family's corn and soybean farm in Stanford, Illinois. She has a brother, Brian. In 1988, she graduated from Olympia High School in Stanford, where she was in the marching band, ran cross-country and track, and played varsity basketball.

In 1992, Loeffler graduated with a Bachelor of Science in marketing from the University of Illinois Urbana-Champaign's Gies College of Business, where she was a member of the Alpha Gamma Delta sorority. After college, she worked for Toyota as a district account manager. In 1999, she graduated with a Master of Business Administration (MBA) in international finance and marketing from DePaul University's Kellstadt Graduate School of Business. She financed her graduate school tuition by mortgaging land inherited from her grandparents.

== Early career ==
After earning her MBA, Loeffler worked for Citibank, William Blair & Company, and the Crossroads Group. In 2002, she joined Intercontinental Exchange, a commodity and financial service provider, in investor relations. She married the firm's CEO, Jeffrey Sprecher, in 2004. Loeffler was eventually promoted to senior vice president of investor relations and corporate communications. In 2018, she became the chief executive officer (CEO) of Bakkt, a subsidiary of Intercontinental Exchange.

In 2010, Loeffler bought a minority stake in the Atlanta Dream of the Women's National Basketball Association (WNBA). In 2011, she and Mary Brock bought the team from Kathy Betty. Loeffler took an active role in the team, arranging her travel schedule to attend all games and often meeting with head coach Michael Cooper during halftime to analyze the first half of the game. Due in part to her stance on the Black Lives Matter movement, and the resulting criticism expressed by many players on the Dream roster and within the league, in February 2021 Loeffler sold her stake in the team.

When Loeffler left Intercontinental Exchange to join the Senate, the company awarded her over $9 million of financial assets. A spokesperson for Loeffler said Loeffler "left millions in equity compensation behind" by joining the Senate.

=== Political donations ===
According to OpenSecrets, as of December 2019, Loeffler and her husband, Jeffrey Sprecher, had donated $3.2 million to political committees. Ninety-seven percent of these donations went to Republicans, and three percent to Democrats, including Hillary Clinton, Chris Dodd, Debbie Stabenow, and Georgia congressman David Scott (GA–13), who received $10,200. Loeffler donated $750,000 to Restore Our Future, a super PAC supporting former governor Mitt Romney's 2012 presidential campaign. The National Republican Senatorial Committee received $247,500 from Loeffler and Sprecher.

In May 2020, Loeffler's husband gave $1 million to a Trump 2020 reelection super PAC, his largest federal political donation to date.

In June 2025, following her confirmation as head of the Small Business Administration, Loeffler and her husband each donated $2.5 million to MAGA Inc., a super PAC that supports Donald Trump.

== United States senator from Georgia (2020–2021) ==
=== Appointment ===
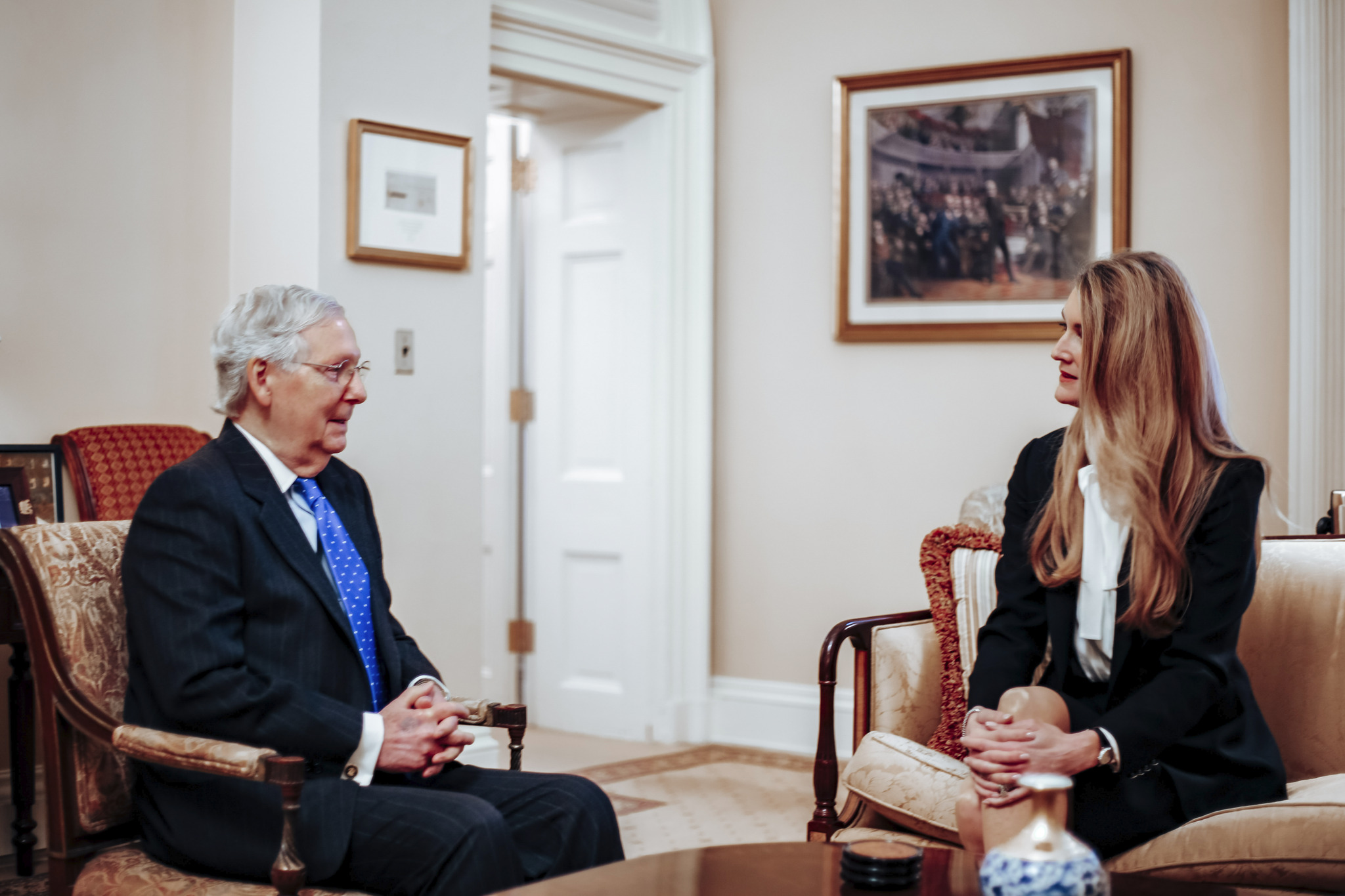
Loeffler meeting with Mitch McConnell in December 2019

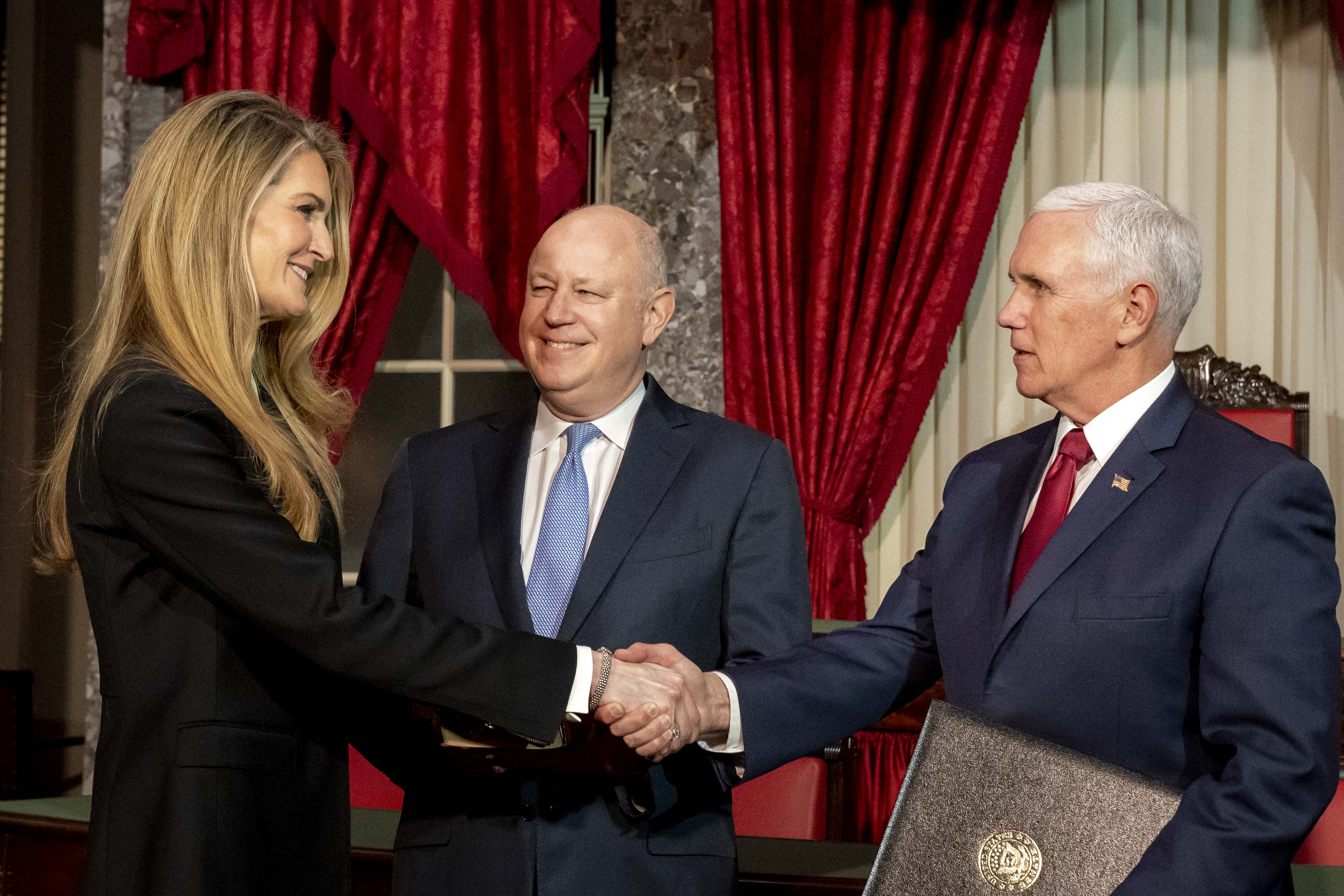
Loeffler after being sworn in as Senator by Vice President Mike Pence

Loeffler considered seeking the Republican nomination in the 2014 United States Senate election in Georgia but ultimately passed on the race because of Intercontinental Exchange's pending acquisition of the New York Stock Exchange.

On August 28, 2019, sitting Georgia senator Johnny Isakson announced that he would resign at the end of the year, citing health reasons. On December 4, 2019, in accordance with Georgia law, Governor Kemp appointed Loeffler to fill Isakson's unexpired term until the next regularly scheduled statewide election in November 2020. Kemp traveled to Washington to explain why he wanted to appoint Loeffler instead of Trump's choice, Representative Doug Collins, who helped lead the House opposition to Trump's impeachment. The choice of Loeffler angered many Georgia conservatives who had supported Collins.

On January 6, 2020, Loeffler was sworn in to the Senate. She became the second female to represent Georgia in the U.S. Senate. The first was Rebecca Latimer Felton, also the first female U.S. senator, who served a symbolic one-day term in 1922. The appointment was valid until the runoff election scheduled for January 5, 2021, because no candidate in the November 2020 election received a majority of the vote.

=== Tenure and political positions ===
Loeffler characterized herself as among the most conservative Republican in the Senate and allied herself with President Trump. During her tenure in the Senate, Loeffler sponsored 57 bills and cosponsored 210. She voted in line with President Trump's stated position 80% of the time.

Loeffler supported Republican efforts to repeal the Affordable Care Act. Loeffler opposed abortion and supported anti-abortion legislation. The anti-abortion group Susan B. Anthony List initially opposed Loeffler's appointment, but endorsed her in the 2020 election. Loeffler donated portions of her Senate salary to anti-abortion pregnancy centers and an anti-LGBTQ adoption agency.

On gun issues, Loeffler received "A" ratings from the NRA Political Victory Fund and Gun Owners of America. She cosponsored the Concealed Carry Reciprocity Act and opposed the assault weapons ban and red flag law proposals. Loeffler supported constructing a border wall along the Mexico–United States border, and the appointment of conservative judges to federal courts. In September 2020, she introduced legislation to the Senate floor that would bar transgender women from participating in girls' and women's sports. The bill stated "sex shall be recognized based solely on a person's reproductive biology and genetics at birth".

In February 2020, Loeffler said that "Democrats have dangerously and intentionally misled the American people on #Coronavirus readiness". She went on to say that regarding COVID-19, "Americans are in good hands with" the Trump administration. In March 2020, Loeffler said that the U.S. was "in the best economic position" to handle COVID-19. She criticized Democrats, writing that they "continue to play politics with" COVID-19.

In October 2020, shortly after Trump and First Lady Melania Trump were diagnosed with COVID-19 after attending events where they closely interacted with other individuals while maskless, Loeffler, who often appeared at rallies and gatherings without wearing a mask, blamed their contraction of the disease on the People's Republic of China, tweeting, "China gave this virus to our President @realDonaldTrump and First Lady @FLOTUS. WE MUST HOLD THEM ACCOUNTABLE."

During the 2021 United States Electoral College vote count in January 2021, Loeffler was slated to vote against the measure, but after the storming of the U.S. Capitol, which Loeffler witnessed, she changed her mind, saying, "The events that transpired have forced me to reconsider. I cannot now in good conscience object to the certification of the votes."

=== Committees ===
- Committee on Health Education Labor & Pensions
  - Subcommittee on Children and Families
  - Subcommittee on Employment and Workplace Safety
  - Primary Health and Retirement Security
- Joint Economic Committee
- Committee on Veterans Affairs
- Committee on Agriculture, Nutrition, & Forestry
  - Conservation, Forestry, and Natural Resources
  - Livestock, Marketing, and Agriculture Security

==== COVID-19 insider trading investigation ====
On March 19, 2020, the release of federal financial disclosure documents showed that Loeffler and her husband Jeffrey Sprecher, chairman and CEO of the Intercontinental Exchange (a corporation that owns the New York Stock Exchange), had sold stock in companies vulnerable to the COVID-19 pandemic with an aggregate value of several million dollars. They began selling stocks on January 24, the same day Loeffler attended a private briefing of the Committee on Health, Education, Labor & Pensions on the spread of the disease, before the public had been alerted to its severity. Loeffler denied any wrongdoing, saying the trades were made by a third-party advisor and that she learned about them only after they occurred. Between January 24 and February 14, the couple sold between $1.275 and $3.1 million worth of stock in 27 companies, while buying stocks worth between $450,000 and $1 million, including in Citrix, which develops remote collaboration software.

The government watchdog group Common Cause filed complaints with the Justice Department, the Securities and Exchange Commission and the Senate Ethics Committee, alleging possible violations of the STOCK Act and insider trading laws in the matter of stock sales by Loeffler and three other senators, Richard Burr, Jim Inhofe, and Dianne Feinstein. Loeffler and Sprecher had sold at least $18.7 million in Intercontinental Exchange stock before the 2020 stock market crash. After being criticized for the trades, Loeffler and Sprecher sold their individual stocks in an effort "to move beyond the distraction" caused by trades they made before and during the market decline caused by the COVID-19 outbreak. On May 26, 2020, the U.S. Department of Justice announced that it had closed its inquiry into Loeffler. On June 16, 2020, the Senate Ethics Committee dismissed Common Cause's complaint, writing to Loeffler, "Based on all the information before it, the Committee did not find evidence that your actions violated federal law, Senate Rules or standards of conduct."

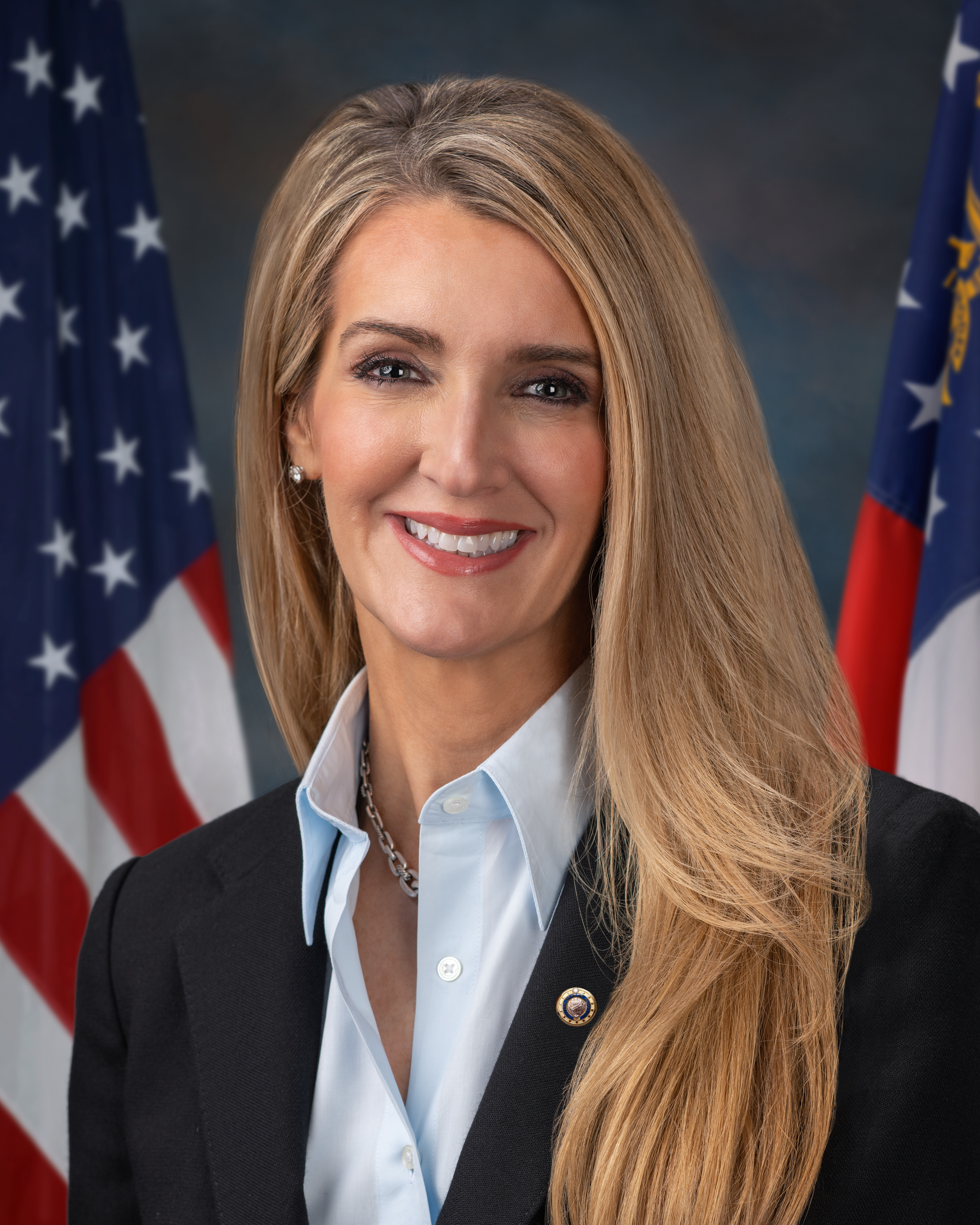
Loeffler in 2020

=== 2020–2021 U.S. Senate special election ===
Loeffler ran to serve the remaining two years of the Senate term to which she had been appointed. She planned to spend $20 million of her own money on her campaign. Under Georgia's election law, all candidates for the seat (regardless of political party) compete in a nonpartisan blanket primary; in addition to Democratic candidates, Loeffler, backed by the National Republican Senatorial Committee, was challenged by fellow Republican Doug Collins, who represented Georgia's 9th congressional district.

In July 2020, Loeffler, who co-owned the Atlanta Dream, wrote the WNBA a public letter objecting to players wearing shirts with "Black Lives Matter" and "Say Her Name" printed on them, and suggesting they wear American flags instead. She stated her opposition to the Black Lives Matter movement, saying it "advocates things like defunding and abolishing the police, abolishing our military, emptying our prisons, destroying the nuclear family" and "promotes violence and antisemitism". Her comments led some WNBA players to call for her removal from ownership. Loeffler later said that the movement was "based on Marxist principles" and threatens to "destroy" America. In August 2020, players from the Dream and several other teams wore "Vote Warnock" T-shirts in support of one of Loeffler's Democratic challengers in the special election.

During her 2020 campaign, Loeffler said that she had never disagreed with Trump. Loeffler touted that she had been endorsed by Marjorie Taylor Greene, a controversial Republican who won the election for Georgia's 14th congressional district. Greene had a history of promotion of the QAnon conspiracy theory and of commentary that has been considered racist. Asked whether she accepted Greene's endorsement given Greene's history of remarks, Loeffler said she knew nothing about QAnon and criticized the media for misrepresenting or faking events.

As no candidate received over 50% of the vote in the election, Loeffler, who came in second, participated in a runoff election on January 5, 2021, against the primary's first-place finisher, Democratic candidate Raphael Warnock. The other senate race from the state between David Perdue and Jon Ossoff also went to a runoff. This meant if Democrats won both seats, which they ultimately did, they would take control of the senate in a 50–50 tie, because Vice President Kamala Harris had the tie breaking vote. After the November election, Loeffler and the other U.S. senator from Georgia, David Perdue, claimed without evidence that there had been "failures" in the election, and called for the resignation of the Georgia secretary of state Brad Raffensperger, a fellow Republican. Their rhetoric fed into falsehoods and conspiracy theories among segments of the right, including Trump, who lost the presidential election to Joe Biden. There was no evidence of wrongdoing in connection with the election. Raffensperger rejected the calls for his resignation. According to Politico, Loeffler repeated Trump's baseless claims of fraud because she wanted the support of Trump and his core voters in the January runoff. In December 2020, Loeffler supported a lawsuit by Trump allies seeking to overturn the election results.

On November 20, 2020, Loeffler spoke without a mask at a rally in Canton, Georgia, 46 days before the runoff. Later that day, she tested positive for COVID-19; the result of a subsequent test the following day was inconclusive. She had intermittently worn a mask while campaigning. Attendees at her rallies were mostly maskless. As a consequence of the initial positive test result, Loeffler canceled future appearances at rallies, entering quarantine for the recommended time period. On January 1, 2021, Loeffler absented herself from the successful override of Trump's veto of the defense spending bill.

Throughout the campaign she sought to win the support of pro-Trump voters. She touted her endorsement from Trump; he held a rally in the state shortly before the election. At the rally, he asked his supporters to vote for Loeffler, also repeating debunked voter fraud allegations. Her campaign tried to paint her opponent Raphael Warnock as a socialist in a series of campaign ads, calling for people to vote for her to "hold the line" against what she called socialism. In a December 6, 2020, debate she repeatedly accused her opponent of being a "radical liberal" and refused to admit Joe Biden was the winner of the 2020 United States presidential election. With Democrats in the race calling for $2,000 COVID-19 stimulus payments if they won and Donald Trump backing the policy, she announced she would back the payments.

The Associated Press called the race for Warnock (51%-49%) in the early morning hours of January 6. Warnock's narrow win was attributed to a large black voter turnout in the runoff. That same day, Loeffler planned to object to the certification of the presidential election results, but ultimately withdrew her objection and accepted the results. Loeffler conceded to Warnock on January 7.

== Return to the private sector (2021–2025) ==
Following her tenure in the U.S. Senate, Loeffler founded Greater Georgia, an organization that planned to register likely conservative voters in Georgia, expand conservative messaging infrastructure, and advocate for changes to voting laws to increase election security. Loeffler personally invested at least $1 million in the organization.

In July 2023, Loeffler joined the board of directors of PublicSquare, an online marketplace marketed towards conservatives.

During the 2024 United States presidential election, Loeffler was a major donor to Donald Trump, having contributed more than $4.9 million to his re-election effort.

== Administrator of the Small Business Administration (2025–present) ==
=== Nomination and confirmation ===
On December 4, 2024, President-elect Donald Trump announced his intent to nominate Loeffler for Administrator of the Small Business Administration in the second Trump administration.

Loeffler appeared before the Senate Committee on Small Business and Entrepreneurship on January 29, 2025. The committee advanced her nomination in a 12–7 vote on February 5, 2025. On February 19, 2025, the U.S. Senate confirmed Loeffler's nomination with a 52–46 vote.

=== Tenure ===
Loeffler was sworn in as the 28th Administrator of the Small Business Administration on February 20, 2025.

=== 2025 Hatch Act complaint ===
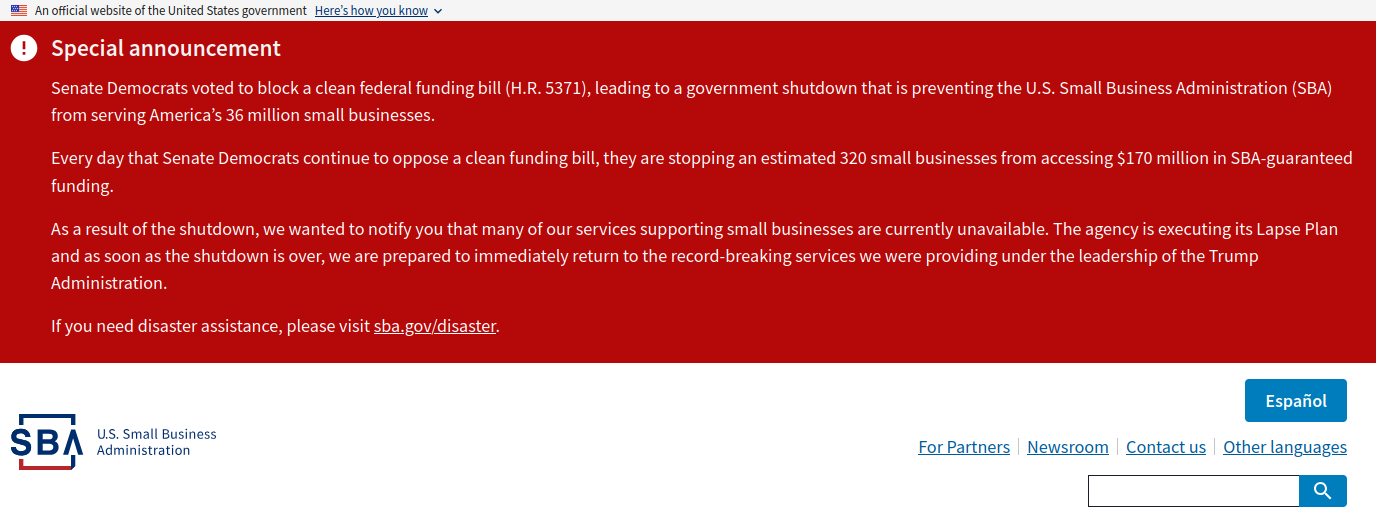
The SBA shutdown notice causing the Hatch Act complaint over Loeffler

During the 2025 United States federal government shutdown, Loeffler became as administrator of the SBA subject of a Hatch Act complaint filed by the Public Citizen watchdog group alleging that Loeffler engaged in "electioneering" while on duty.

== Personal life ==
Loeffler is a Roman Catholic.

In 2004, Loeffler married Jeffrey Sprecher, the founder and CEO of Intercontinental Exchange and chairman of the New York Stock Exchange. They live in Tuxedo Park, Atlanta, in a $10.5 million, 15,000-square-foot (1,400 m^{2}) estate, bought in 2013 in what was then the most expensive residential real estate transaction ever recorded in Atlanta. They have four additional homes and a condo. In November 2020, Newsweek reported Loeffler's and Sprecher's combined net worth at $800 million, making her the wealthiest sitting U.S. senator at the time.

== Electoral history ==
United States Senate special election in Georgia, November 3, 2020
Party	Candidate	Votes	%	±%
Democratic	Raphael Warnock	1,617,035	32.9%	
Republican	Kelly Loeffler (incumbent)	1,273,214	25.9%	
Republican	Doug Collins	980,454	20.0%	
Democratic	Deborah Jackson	324,118	6.6%	
Democratic	Matt Lieberman	136,021	2.8%	
Democratic	Tamara Johnson-Shealey	106,767	2.2%	
Democratic	Jamesia James	94,406	1.9%	
Republican	Derrick Grayson	51,592	1.0%	
Democratic	Joy Felicia Slade	44,945	0.9%	
Republican	Annette Davis Jackson	44,335	0.9%	
Republican	Kandiss Taylor	40,349	0.8%	
Republican	A. Wayne Johnson	36,176	0.7%	
Libertarian	Brian Slowinski	35,431	0.7%	
Democratic	Richard Dien Winfield	28,687	0.6%	
Democratic	Ed Tarver	26,333	0.5%	
Independent	Allen Buckley	17,954	0.4%	
Green	John Fortuin	15,293	0.3%	
Independent	Elbert Bartell	14,640	0.3%	
Independent	Valencia Stovall	13,318	0.3%	
Independent	Michael Todd Greene	13,293	0.3%	
Write-in	Rod Mack	7	0.0%	
Total votes		4,914,368	100.0%	

United States Senate special election runoff in Georgia, January 5, 2021
Party	Candidate	Votes	%	±%
Democratic	Raphael Warnock	2,288,923	51.0%	
Republican	Kelly Loeffler (incumbent)	2,195,373	49.0%	
Total votes		4,484,296	100.0%	
Democratic gain from Republican				

== See also ==
- Women in conservatism in the United States
- Women in the United States Senate

U.S. Senate
Preceded by Johnny Isakson	U.S. Senator (Class 3) from Georgia; 2020–2021; Served alongside: David Perdue	Succeeded by Raphael Warnock
Party political offices
Preceded by Johnny Isakson	Republican nominee for U.S. Senator from Georgia (Class 3); 2020	Succeeded by Herschel Walker
Political offices
Preceded by Isabel Guzman	Administrator of the Small Business Administration; 2025–present	Incumbent
U.S. order of precedence (ceremonial)
Preceded by Mike Waltz as Ambassador of the United States to the United Nations	Order of precedence of the United States as Administrator of the Small Business Administration	Succeeded by Bill Pulte as Acting Director of National Intelligence
