= Alex Pfeiffer (political advisor) =

American spokesman (born 1996)

Principal Deputy White House Communications Director
- In office January 25, 2025 – September 2025
- President: Donald Trump
- Director: Steven Cheung
- Preceded by: Herbie Ziskend

Personal details
- Born: Alexander Pfeiffer; July 25, 1996 (age 30)
- Spouse: Joely Friedman (m. 2019)

Alexander Pfeiffer (born July 25, 1996) is an American spokesman, television producer, and journalist who served as the principal deputy White House communications director from January to September 2025.

Pfeiffer began working for The Daily Caller by February 2016. In December 2017, he became an associate producer of Tucker Carlson Tonight (2017–2023), later serving as an investigative and editorial producer. In April 2022, Pfeiffer founded consulting firm Pfeiffer Public Affairs for conservative media. In September, he joined MAGA Inc.'s communications team, becoming its communications director by July 2023. Pfeiffer formally joined Donald Trump's presidential campaign in August 2024 and served as a spokesman for Trump's second presidential transition.

In January 2025, Trump named Pfeiffer as his principal deputy White House communications director. In September, he resigned to work for Watchtower Strategy, a public affairs firm. He later became a spokesperson for MAGA Inc.

== Personal life ==
Alexander Pfeiffer was born on July 25, 1996. In January 2019, Pfeiffer proposed to Joely Friedman, a communications consultant for National Geographic Partners; they married in December.

== Career ==
=== The Daily Caller and Tucker Carlson Tonight (2016–2022) ===
By February 2016, Pfeiffer had become a journalist for the right-wing news website The Daily Caller. In December 2017, he joined Fox News to become an associate producer of Tucker Carlson Tonight (2017–2023). By April 2022, he had worked as an investigative and editorial producer for Tucker Carlson Tonight. In Dominion Voting Systems v. Fox News Network (2023), text messages that Pfeiffer had sent to Tucker Carlson after the 2020 presidential election were submitted into evidence and released. The messages revealed that Pfeiffer had sought to disregard "reckless demagogues" who engaged in efforts to overturn the election. Carlson and Pfeiffer rebuked claims that sufficient electoral fraud had occurred to ensure Joe Biden's victory, particularly from Sidney Powell, whom they had regarded as a "nut". Pfeiffer told Carlson that Trump's business career has had a "pretty low rate at success" and expressed fear of Trump's supporters after the January 6 Capitol attack.

=== Trump campaign work (2022–2024) ===
In July 2022, Pfeiffer founded the consulting firm Pfeiffer Public Affairs for conservative media. In September, he joined MAGA Inc.'s communications team, becoming its communications director by July 2023. Pfeiffer formally joined Donald Trump's presidential campaign in August 2024. He discovered a video of vice president Kamala Harris speaking about transgender prisoners to the American Civil Liberties Union in 2019. The video was used in "Kamala is for they/them", a series of political advertisements. Pfeiffer served as a spokesman for Trump's second presidential transition.

=== Principal deputy White House communications director (January–September 2025) ===
On January 24, 2025, Trump named Pfeiffer as his principal deputy White House communications director. In September, Axios reported that Pfeiffer had resigned that month to work for Watchtower Strategy, a public affairs firm.

=== Post-government activities (2025–present) ===
By February 2026, Pfeiffer had become a spokesperson for MAGA Inc.
