= Make America Great Again Inc. =

American political action committee

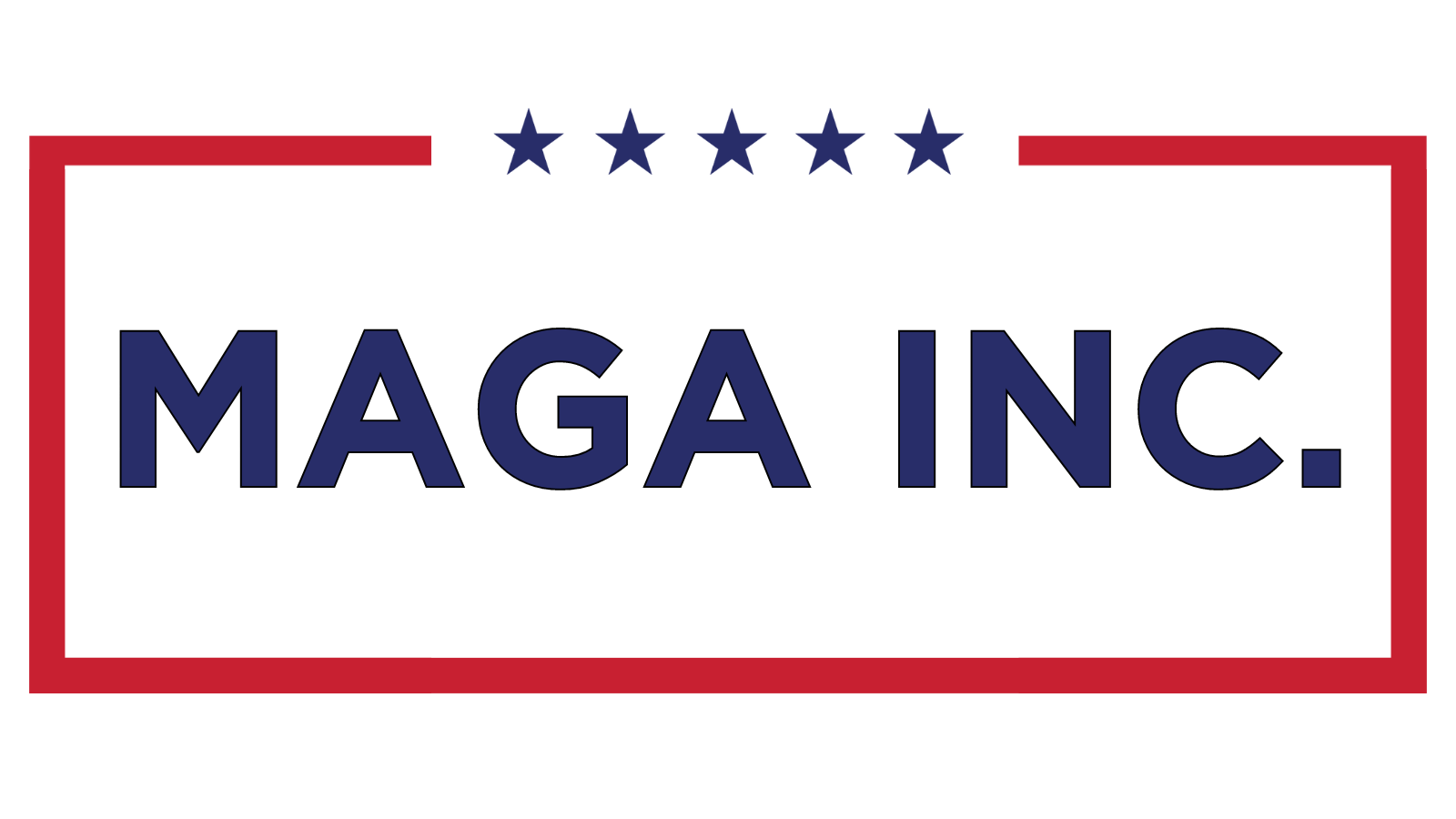
- Abbreviation: MAGA Inc.
- Formation: September 23, 2022; 4 years ago
- Type: Independent expenditure-only political committee (super PAC)
- Registration no.: C00892471; Formerly: C00825851
- Location: Virginia, United States
- Executive director: Taylor Budowich
- Chief Strategist: Chris LaCivita
- Affiliations: Save America

Make America Great Again Inc. (abbreviated as MAGA Inc.) is an American super PAC that supports Donald Trump. It was founded on September 23, 2022. As a super PAC, it can raise unlimited money for campaigns and spend it freely to support Trump, but it is barred from coordinating directly with presidential campaigns.

In February 2026 the Brennan Center for Justice reported that MAGA Inc. Pac relied almost entirely on megadonors, with 96% of its funds coming from donors who made donations of $1 million or more and 62% from donors who gave $5 million or more. Many donors benefited from Trump policies during his second term.

== History ==
=== Founding ===
A Statement of Organization was filed with the Federal Election Commission on September 23, 2022, for Make America Great Again Inc. as an independent expenditure-only political committee (super PAC) that is supporting US president Donald Trump, and is located in Alexandria, Virginia.

Distinct from Trump's existing Save America leadership PAC, which had served as his chief fundraising vehicle, as a super PAC it can raise unlimited money for campaigns and spend it freely to support him. However, super PACs are barred from coordinating directly with campaigns.

Taylor Budowich, a 36-year-old former aide of Trump, was named the group's executive director. In June 2023, Budowich testified before a federal grand jury in Miami as part of special counsel Jack Smith's investigation into Trump's handling of classified documents.

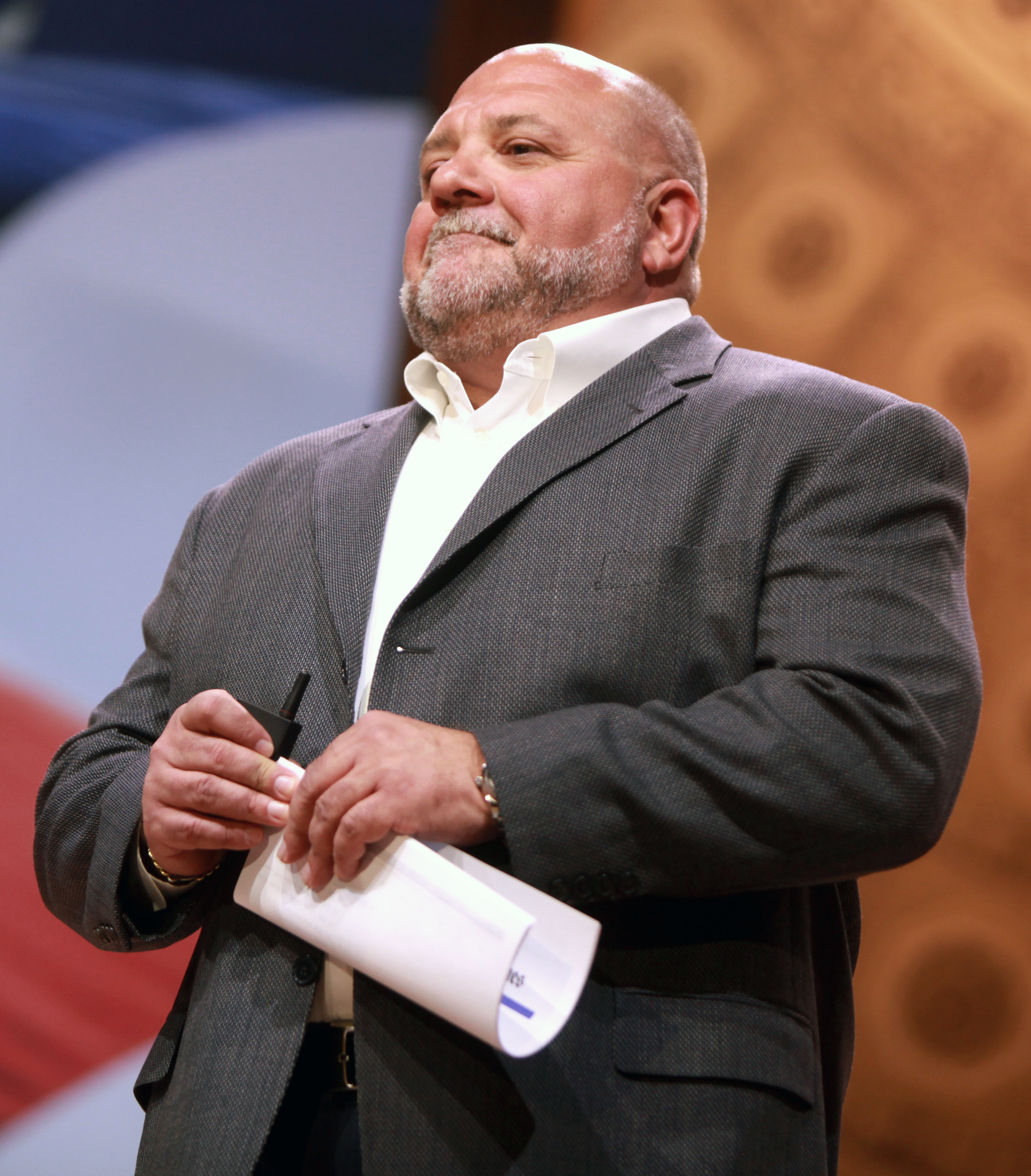
Maga Inc. pollster Tony Fabrizio

Other staff of the super PAC are former Trump campaign aide Steven Cheung (communications director; who worked on Trump's 2016 and 2020 campaigns, is a former White House assistant communications director, and a former Ultimate Fighting Championship communications executive), longtime Trump pollster Tony Fabrizio (running polling operations); veteran GOP operative Chris LaCivita (chief strategist; former Swift Vets lead operator); and Sergio Gor (former campaign adviser and the publisher of Trump's post-presidential book A Journey Together, as a senior adviser). Karoline Leavitt, who ran for New Hampshire's 1st District l in the 2022 United States House of Representatives elections in New Hampshire, is the spokeswoman for MAGA Inc. Alex Pfeiffer, a former producer for Fox News' Tucker Carlson, also joined the operation as communications director.

=== Fundraising in 2022 ===
In October 2022, Save America transferred $20 million to MAGA Inc. In November 2022, the campaign finance watchdog Campaign Legal Center (CLC) filed a complaint with the Federal Election Commission (FEC), alleging that the transfer was inappropriate inasmuch as Trump was already a presidential candidate when he made the transfer. In May 2023, NRDC Action Fund affiliated super PAC, NRDC Action Votes, joined CLC in a supplemental complaint alleging that former Trump and Save America violated the Federal Election Campaign Act (FECA), specifically, the provisions that prohibit federal election candidates from utilizing "soft money", which refers to money that is not adherent to contribution limits, source prohibitions, or reporting requirements for election candidates.

Also that month, businessman Timothy Mellon contributed $1.5 million to MAGA Inc. Businessman Andrew Beal donated $500,000 to the super PAC.

Trump's Save America PAC transferred $60 million to MAGA Inc. in 2022. MAGA Inc. reported $54 million in cash on hand at the end of 2022. MAGA Inc. spent money opposing some political candidates in 2022 (most notably $3.4 million opposing Raphael Warnock who won, $3.4 million opposing John Fetterman who won, and $3.0 million opposing Mark Kelly who won), and supporting some other political candidates (most notably $0.7 million supporting Blake Masters who lost, $0.09 million supporting Adam Laxalt who lost, and $0.08 supporting Mehmet Oz who lost).

=== 2023 ===
In June 2023, MAGA Inc filed a 15-page complaint with the Florida Commission on Ethics accusing Florida governor Ron DeSantis of violating federal and state campaign finance and ethics rules by running a shadow campaign for president.

By June 30, 2023, MAGA Inc. had spent more than $23 million in 2023, almost entirely on ads attacking Ron DeSantis.

In July 2023, Alina Habba joined the PAC as legal spokesperson and general counsel.

MAGA Inc. gave back more than $12 million to Trump's Save America PAC in the first half of 2023, after Save America requested a refund; that accounted for one-third of MAGA Inc.'s spending over that time period. It spent $22 million on buying TV ads in support of Trump. MAGA Inc. spent more than it raised in the first six months of the year, raising $14.6 million. It reported $30.8 million in its account as of June 30; at the same time, the PAC of Ron DeSantis had $96.8 million in cash on hand, and the PAC of Nikki Haley had $17.1 million in cash on hand.

Its top donors over the first six months of 2023 were Scientologist Patricia Duggan ($5 million) and casino owner Phil Ruffin ($2 million). New York Jets owner Woody Johnson (U.S. ambassador to the United Kingdom under Trump) and Charles Kushner (Trump's son-in-law's father, whom Trump pardoned) both gave $1 million.

=== 2024 ===
On May 31, 2024, Timothy Mellon, a billionaire banking heir, gave $50 million to the PAC. Mellon also contributed $50 million in July 2024, which was over 90% of the money raised for MAGA Inc. in July. Diane Hendricks gave $10 million, while the CEO of Cantor Fitzgerald, Howard Lutnick, and Paul Singer of Elliott Management, both contributed $5 million each to MAGA Inc.

=== 2025 ===
In the first six months of 2025, notable donors included Marc Andreessen ($3 million), William E. Ford ($1.25 million), Antonio Gracias ($1 million), Jerry Jones ($1 million), Ronald Lauder ($5 million), Kelly Loeffler ($2.5 million), Timothy Mellon (nearly $2 million), Lynsi Snyder-Ellingson ($2 million), Jeffrey Sprecher ($2.5 million), Warren Stephens ($1 million), Kelcy Warren ($12.5 million), Cameron Winklevoss ($500,000), Tyler Winklevoss ($500,000), and Jeff Yass ($16 million, the highest donation recorded for the period). Cryptocurrency companies Blockchain.com donated $5 million, and Ava Labs donated $1 million.

In February 2025, Anjani Sinha donated $1 million to MAGA Inc.; Sinha was subsequently nominated for US Ambassador to Singapore the following month.

In March 2025, Taylor Farms donated $1 million to MAGA Inc.

In April 2025, former NFL player Cody Campbell donated $500,000 to MAGA Inc.; in July, Campbell was named to the President's Council on Sports, Fitness, and Nutrition.

In June 2025, Elon Musk donated $5 million to MAGA Inc. The same month, Jared Isaacman donated $1 million.

Georgia 2026 gubernatorial primary candidate Rick Jackson gave $1 million to MAGA Inc. in December 2025. Hess Corporation CEO John B. Hess and his wife, Susan, also contributed $1 million each that same month.

=== 2026 ===
In January 2026, Matthew Moroun, owner of the Ambassador Bridge connecting Detroit and Windsor, Ontario, donated $1 million to MAGA Inc. A few weeks later, Trump threatened to not allow the competing Gordie Howe International Bridge to open. The Gordie Howe Bridge was planned to be opened in June 2026 but the opening was delayed with a White House official citing President Trump's position not changing since February.

In April 2026, Reynolds American donated $5 million to MAGA Inc., about one week before the Trump Administration allowed flavored vapes to be sold on shelves and allowed higher nicotine levels in nicotine pouches. Two days after the donation, a top executive at Reynolds and two lobbyists had lunch with President Trump at his golf club in Florida.

In the first six months of 2026, the PAC also received $35 million from Foris Dax, $25 million from Greg & Anna Brockman, $25 million from Miriam Adelson, $16,000,000 from Jeff & Janine Yass, $12 million from Ben Horowitz & Marc Andreessen, and $5.5 million from Cameron & Tyler Winklevoss.

== See also ==
- Great America PAC
- Make America Great Again
