= Akshay Naheta =

Indian-born British business executive

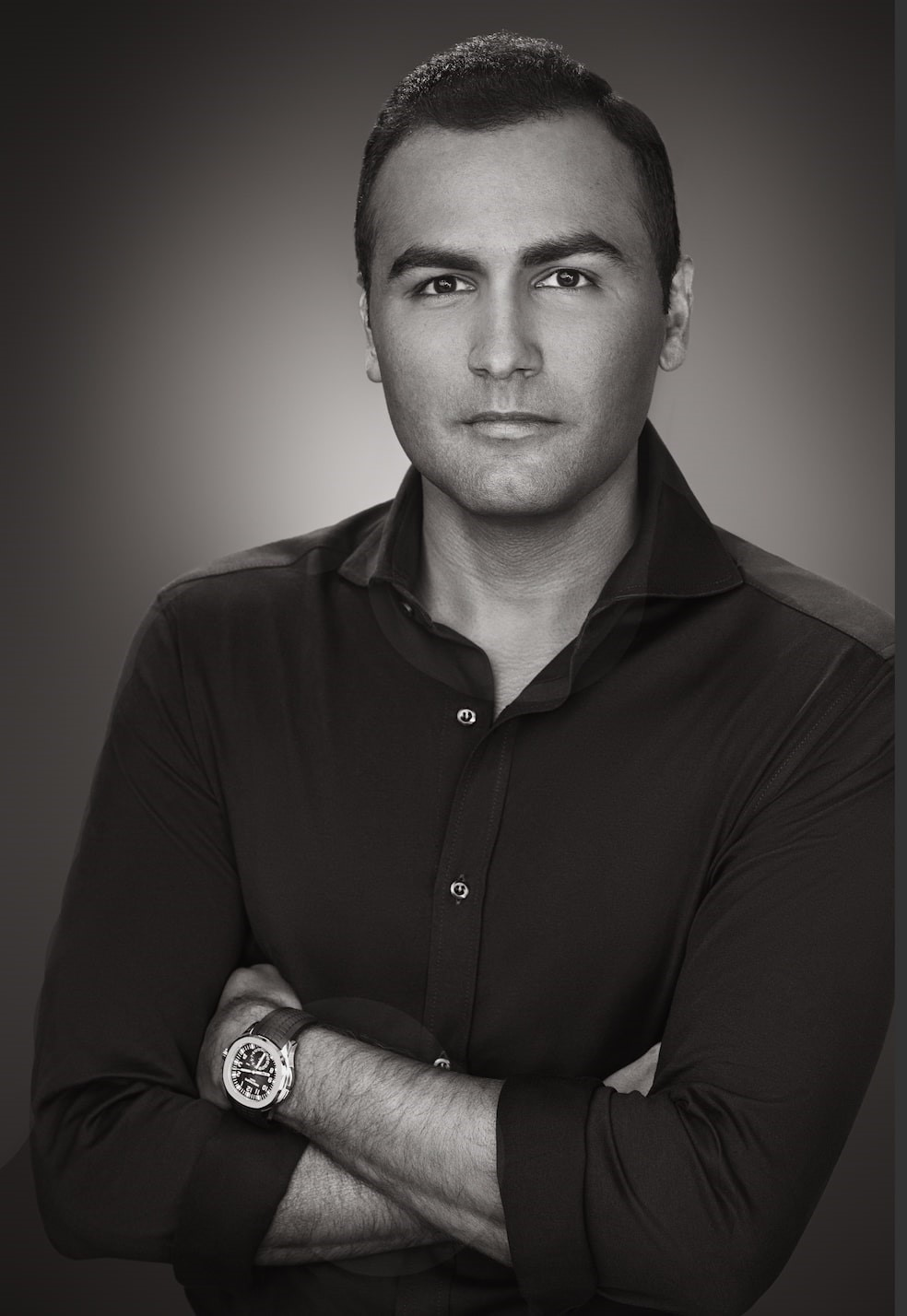
- Born: 23 July 1981 (age 45); Mumbai, India
- Education: University of Illinois at Urbana-Champaign, MIT
- Occupations: Chief executive officer, Bakkt, Founder and CEO, Distributed Technologies Research (Prior to the acquisition by Bakkt)
- Awards: Fortune's 40 Under 40

Akshay Naheta (born 23 July 1981) is an Indian-born British business executive. He is the chief executive officer of Bakkt, Inc and sits on the company's board of directors. He joined Bakkt, Inc. in March 2025 as the co-CEO of Bakkt. Prior to the acquisition by Bakkt, Inc. in April 2026, he served as the founder and chief executive officer of Distributed Technologies Research (DTR), a decentralized finance startup focusing on stablecoin technology and other linked services.

He was previously Senior Vice President, Investments at SoftBank Group where he was involved in several high-profile investments for the Vision Fund, including Auto1 and chipmaker Nvidia.

Additionally, he was the chief architect behind the planned $40 billion sale of the British software design and semiconductor firm Arm to Nvidia, “creating world’s premier computing company for the age of AI,” and was responsible for its restructuring. In early February 2022, Nvidia and Arm agreed to terminate the deal due to significant regulatory challenges, with the newly restructured Arm prepared for a public offering. Despite the termination of the deal, Softbank made $2 billion due to the break fee, which was paid upfront at the signing of the deal.

While at SoftBank, Naheta helped founder and CEO Masayoshi Son monetize his stake in Alibaba Group. Son described Naheta as having “helped create significant value for shareholders."

In 2020, he was included in Fortune’s "40 Under 40" most influential people in finance list and was named a World Economic Forum Young Global Leader. In February 2021, he was also listed on GQ India’s 25 Most Influential Young Indians list.

== Early life and education ==
Naheta was born in Mumbai in 1981 to an Indian family of jewelers. He graduated with a Bachelor of Science in electrical engineering from the University of Illinois at Urbana-Champaign (UIUC) in 2003. At UIUC he was a recipient of several awards for academics, research and leadership. In 2020, he received a Young Alumni Achievement Award from the university.

He subsequently obtained an S.M. in electrical engineering and computer science from the Massachusetts Institute of Technology (MIT) in 2004. He dropped out of pursuing a PhD at MIT to begin a career in finance.

== Career ==
=== Distributed Technology Research ===
Naheta established Distributed Technology Research within the Emirate's international financial free zone. DTR, a fintech company focused on simplifying global payments infrastructure. The company entered into a commercial agreement with Bakkt, Inc. in March 2025 to integrate DTR’s stablecoin-based technology infrastructure with Bakkt’s platform. DTR was acquired by Bakkt, Inc. on April 30, 2026.

=== SoftBank ===
In 2017, Naheta joined SoftBank Investment Advisors as an investment manager in the Vision Fund, a technology-focused fund, and was responsible for acquisitions and public equity investments.

At the fund, Naheta supported SoftBank's acquisition of a $3.6 billion stake in Silicon Valley–based graphics chipmaker Nvidia in 2017. SoftBank sold its stake in the chipmaker in January 2019, making a profit of $3.3 billion on its investment. During Naheta's time at the Vision Fund, he led several other investments such as Auto1, Wirecard, Roivant Sciences, Brazilian logistics company Loggi, Energy Vault, Creditas and Cambridge Mobile Telematics (CMT).

Roivant Sciences' founder, and future presidential candidate Vivek Ramaswamy described Naheta as a 'very fast study'.

In June 2020, SoftBank named Naheta as a Senior Vice President of Investments for SoftBank Group, becoming the CEO of SB Management, a newly formed unit of SoftBank, which manages the fund SB Northstar. It was later revealed that SB Northstar was the "Nasdaq Whale" responsible for massive investments in US tech stocks in the summer of 2020.

In December 2021, Bloomberg reported that Naheta was in talks to leave SoftBank Group, possibly taking "an advisory role at the firm to focus on his own long-only fund".

==== Sale of Arm to Nvidia ====
According to Financial Times, Naheta was "heavily involved" in negotiations between SoftBank and Nvidia about the former's stake in British chip designer Arm Limited. In September 2020, SoftBank announced that it would be selling its stake to Nvidia for $40 billion, after acquiring Arm in 2016 for $32 billion. The deal was expected to see SoftBank take a stake in Nvidia totalling between 6.7% and 8.1%.

The deal was pending regulatory approval, after competition concerns were raised by Google, Microsoft, and Qualcomm and in 2022 the parties agreed to terminate the deal because of significant regulatory challenges.

==== Wirecard ====
Naheta, along with a group of other SoftBank traders, made a convertible bond investment in Wirecard on favorable terms in April 2019, which netted the group instant profits of tens of millions of dollars. The investment, which according to the Wall Street Journal required several conditions to be met including getting Wirecard's 2018 financial results approved by its long-term auditor EY, came from Naheta and other executives from SoftBank, as well as Abu Dhabi’s sovereign wealth fund, the Mubadala Investment Fund. In October 2019, a Financial Times investigation placed Wirecard under scrutiny because of alleged accounting misconduct, later revealing that the company fraudulently inflated over $2 billion in profits. While the investment structure masterminded by Naheta was criticized in its machinations, neither SoftBank nor the investors in the fund that purchased the convertible bond lost money. In June 2020, Naheta criticized Wirecard’s auditor, EY, after the Wirecard revelations and decried EY’s "lack of competence and responsibility displayed." His criticism was published in an article by the Financial Times after it was revealed that Wirecard and its auditor left "a €1.9bn hole in its balance sheet from cash that probably never existed."

In May 2021, the investigation into Wirecard by the German government confirmed EY's misconduct and reported that the auditor inappropriately issued unqualified audits for Wirecard. The investigation, which concluded on 22 June 2021, heavily criticized EY who “could and should have noticed the accounting fraud” as well as Minister of Finance Olaf Scholz, who “should have stepped in when the country’s financial regulator in 2019 issued a ban on short-selling Wirecard stock.”

==== SoftBank dubbed "Nasdaq Whale" ====
In late 2020, the Financial Times revealed that a series of investments in tech giants, which earned SoftBank the title of "Nasdaq Whale", was carried out through SB Northstar. The paper reported that while Naheta was managing SB Northstar, SoftBank's CEO Masayoshi Son was said to have been the "driving force" behind these investments.

In December 2020, it was reported that SB Northstar was stepping away from such derivatives trading, refocusing on long-term investments instead.

==== Other investments ====
In February 2021, shortly after SB Northstar announced a $900 million convertible bond investment in DNA-sequencing company Pacific Biosciences of California, Bloomberg reported that SoftBank was planning to invest billions in biotech stocks. Subsequently, in August 2021, it was reported that SB Northstar has built a $5 billion stake in Swiss pharmaceutical company Roche Holding AG.

The unit has furthermore invested heavily in other tech platforms, including Norwegian game-based learning platform Kahoot! and Swedish CPaaS platform Sinch.

Naheta also spearheaded the group's acquisition of a 40 percent stake, acquired in Vision Fund II for $2.8 billion, in private Norwegian warehouse automation company AutoStore in April 2021. Following the company's listing on the Oslo Stock Exchange on 20 October 2021, the country's biggest IPO in over two decades and Europe's largest IPO in 2021.

=== Bakkt ===
As of September 2025, Naheta serves as the chief executive officer of Bakkt, Inc. and also sits on the company’s board of directors. In March 2025, Naheta joined as the co-chief executive officer of Bakkt, Inc a regulated financial technology company that powers institutional grade trading capabilities, AI-enabled programmable finance, and cross-border payment infrastructure. As of April 2026, he owned 4,286,833 shares, representing an 11.8% interest in the company.

On 11 January 2021, Bakkt and Nasdaq-listed VPC Impact Acquisition Holdings, a Special Purpose Acquisition Company sponsored by Victory Park Capital, entered a definitive agreement that will result in Bakkt's listing on the NYSE with an enterprise value of $2.1 billion. Intercontinental Exchange, Inc. (NYSE: ICE), parent of the New York Stock Exchange, launched Bakkt in 2018 to create an open and regulated, global ecosystem for digital assets.

It is speculated that Donald J Trump's Truth Social is in talks to acquire the company in an all-stock deal.

=== Knight Assets & Co. ===
Naheta left Deutsche Bank in 2010 and founded Knight Assets & Co. in 2011, an investment manager focused on arbitrage and value investing in companies such as Tata Motors and Rolls-Royce Holdings. By the time Naheta left in 2017, Knight Assets had yielded an internal rate of return of 112.5 percent on $416 million in investments, according to VC Circle.

=== Deutsche Bank ===
After graduating from MIT, Naheta joined Deutsche Bank as a trader in New York, subsequently relocating to Hong Kong, where he led the proprietary trading business as the head of principal strategies.

== Affiliations ==
Naheta was member of the board of directors of Arm Limited, Auto1, Bakkt, Inc. and Roivant.

== Awards and honors ==
Title	Year
World Economic Forum Young Global Leader	2020
40 under 40 list Fortune Magazine	2020
University of Illinois Urbana-Champaign Young Alumni Achievement Award	2020
GQ India’s 25 Most Influential Young Indians	2021
