= DocMagic =

American technology company

DocMagic Inc.
- Type: Private
- Founded: December 10, 1987; 38 years ago (as Document Systems, Inc.)
- Headquarters: Torrance, California, U.S.
- Key people: Pat Theodora (CEO)
- Website: Official website

DocMagic, Inc. is an American mortgage technology company that provides digital document preparation, regulatory compliance, electronic signature, electronic vaulting, collaboration tools, and closing solutions for the mortgage industry. Founded in 1987 and headquartered in Torrance, California, the company operates on a software as a service (SaaS) model.]

== History ==
=== Founding and early years ===
DocMagic was founded in 1987 by Dominic Iannitti and Pat Theodora. The company developed automation systems for loan document preparation, management, and delivery processes in the mortgage industry.

=== Acquisitions and expansion ===
In October 2014, DocMagic acquired eSignSystems, the electronic signature and e-vault division of Wave Systems Corp., for $1.2 million. The acquisition included eSignSystems' SmartSAFE platform for eDelivery and eSigning, SmartIDENTITY for signer validation, SmartFORMS for document generation, and SmartCLOSE for MERS eRegistry integration.

In December 2014, DocMagic acquired Doc-Tech Corporation (dba Document Express), a document preparation company; the acquisition brought Doc-Tech's team, including president Lori Johnson, who later became DocMagic's Chief Operating Officer.

In July 2020, DocMagic, Inc., collaborated with Simplifile to introduce modern workflow efficiencies that would further digitize the closing phase, including automation after completion.

=== Leadership transition ===
In July 2024, founder and CEO Dominic Iannitti died unexpectedly. Pat Theodora—formerly the company's Chief Financial Officer and Iannitti's business partner for 37 years—was appointed president and CEO.

== Products and services ==
=== Core solutions ===
DocMagic provides digital mortgage document preparation with automated regulatory compliance, eClosing, eDelivery, and eVault solutions. The company's document generation solution allows users—such as banks, mortgage bankers, or mortgage brokers—to input variables to generate documents used in the mortgage process. DocMagic's eForms Library contains a large selection of documents, including custom letters, brochures, and industry-regulated forms.

=== Total eClose ===
Total eClose is DocMagic's platform for digital closing that includes an eDocument library with eSignature, eNotary, and MERS eRegistration capabilities. The platform is MISMO certified for eClosing and remote online notarization (RON).

=== Electronic notarization services ===
DocMagic's workflows include both in-person electronic notarization (IPEN) and remote online notarization (RON) methods for eNotary services.

=== SmartSAFE eVault ===
DocMagic's SmartSAFE eVault system handles the eNote lifecycle, including validation of electronic records, tamper-evident seals, and document categorization according to MISMO Document Classification standards.

=== SmartCLOSE ===
SmartCLOSE is a collaborative closing portal where lenders, settlement providers, and associates can view, edit, and exchange data and fees prior to closing. The platform includes workflow tools, messaging, TRID tolerance monitoring, and integration with loan origination systems.

=== ClickSign ===
ClickSign is DocMagic's electronic signature platform that provides date- and time-stamped records and audit trails. The platform guides users through the document review and signing process.

=== DocMagic One ===
In September 2025, DocMagic launched DocMagic One, an AI-powered platform that consolidates document preparation, compliance checks, collaboration, and closing coordination. The platform includes business intelligence, lead pipeline analytics, loan health scoring, automated compliance functions, and AI-powered search and chat capabilities.

== Transaction volume ==
By 2025, DocMagic had processed approximately one billion signatures using its eSign service.

== Notable implementations ==
=== Early eClosing implementations ===
In November 2016, DocMagic completed what the company described as the mortgage industry's first comprehensive eClosing in Massachusetts, which included lender and closing/settlement agent documentation, for Radius Financial Group.

In May 2017, DocMagic completed North Carolina's first fully paperless eClosing with North State Bank as part of a state-sponsored pilot program.

=== eHELOC registration ===
In June 2025, DocMagic and Truliant Federal Credit Union completed the first electronic Home Equity Line of Credit (eHELOC) registration with the MERS eRegistry.

== Company operations ==
The company's headquarters in Torrance, California include a technology center and a print fulfillment center.

== Awards and recognition ==
In 2025, CEO and co-founder Pat Theodora received the HousingWire Vanguard Award.

In 2025, HousingWire named DocMagic a Tech100 Award Winner for the 13th consecutive year. DocMagic also received MortgagePoint's 2025 Tech Excellence Award for enhancements to its SmartREGISTRY eNote registry solution.

DocMagic's facility was designed by Rania Alomar Design & Architecture and was recognized by the American Institute of Architects with a 2013 AIA Institute Honor Award for Interior Architecture.
