= Bakkt =

Publicly traded digital asset manager

Bakkt, Inc.
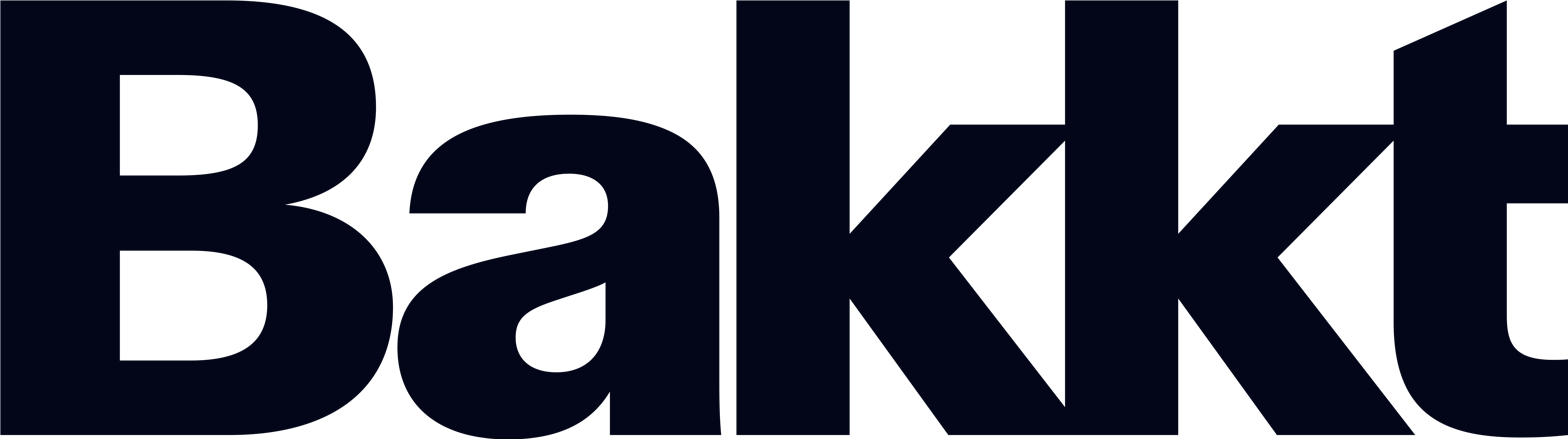
- Type: Public subsidiary
- Traded as: NYSE: BKKT
- Industry: Fintech
- Founded: July 31, 2018; 8 years ago (initially launched as a subsidiary of Intercontinental Exchange); October 18, 2021; 4 years ago (publicly traded company)
- Headquarters: Atlanta, Georgia, U.S.
- Key people: Akshay Naheta (CEO); Karen Alexander (CFO)
- Revenue: ▼US$2.335 billion (2025)
- Operating income: ▲US$−147 million (2025)
- Net income: ▲US$−132 million (2025)
- Total assets: ▼US$162 million (2025)
- Total equity: ▲US$112 million (2025)
- Number of employees: 150 (2026)
- Website: www.bakkt.com

Bakkt Holdings, Inc., provides a software as a service (SaaS) and API platform for owning and trading cryptocurrency and facilitates fiat-to-stablecoin conversion. The company is organized in Delaware, with principal executive offices in New York City.

Bakkt was founded by Intercontinental Exchange (ICE), which also owns the New York Stock Exchange and owned around 20% of the company as of June 2026.

== History ==
=== 2018–2020: Under ICE ownership ===
In August 2018, Intercontinental Exchange formed Bakkt in partnership with Boston Consulting Group (BCG), Microsoft, Starbucks, and others to create a software platform to manage digital assets. Its first use cases was for trading and conversion of Bitcoin (BTC) versus fiat currencies. Kelly Loeffler served as Bakkt's CEO until her appointment to the United States Senate.

In January 2019, Bakkt acquired certain assets of Rosenthal Collins Group to advance its consumer payments initiatives.

In April 2019, Bakkt acquired Digital Asset Custody Company (DACC).

In September 2019, after regulatory delays, Intercontinental Exchange began trading of bitcoin futures.

In February 2020, Intercontinental Exchange acquired Bridge2 Solutions, a loyalty rewards provider, which was then contributed to Bakkt.

=== 2021–present: Public company ===
In October 2021, Bakkt completed a merger with VPC Impact Acquisition Holdings, a special-purpose acquisition company sponsored by Victory Park Capital and was listed on the New York Stock Exchange.

In April 2023, Bakkt acquired Chicago-based integrated crypto trading platform, Apex Crypto.

In March 2025, Akshay Naheta was appointed as the co-chief executive officer and the company also entered into a commercial agreement with Distributed Technologies Research (DTR). Naheta was named the sole CEO effective September 2025.

In July 2025, the company announced it will sell its loyalty points business for $11 million. The company completed the sale in October 2025.

In August 2025, the acquired approximately 30% of the outstanding shares of MarushoHotta, which was renamed Bitcoin Japan.

In November 2025, the company simplified the capital structure and eliminated its umbrella partnership-C corporation "Up-C" structure and transitioned to a single class of stock.

In January 2026, the company changed its corporate name from Bakkt Holdings, Inc. to Bakkt, Inc.

In April 2026, the company acquired Distributed Technologies Research (DTR).
