= Intercontinental Exchange Futures =

Energy futures and options exchange

International Petroleum Exchange (ICE) logo

The London-based International Exchange and since 2005 the ICE Futures was one of the world's largest energy futures and options exchanges. Its flagship commodity, Brent Crude was a world benchmark for oil prices or reference oil. The exchange also handled futures contracts and options on fuel oil, natural gas, electricity (baseload and peakload), coal contracts and, as of 22 April 2005, carbon emission allowances with the European Climate Exchange (ECX).

The IPE was acquired by the Intercontinental Exchange (ICE) in 2001. It was an open outcry exchange until 7 April 2005, when its name was changed to ICE Futures and all trading was shifted onto an electronic trading platform.

== History ==
Until the 1970s, the price of oil was relatively stable with production largely controlled by the biggest oil companies. During that decade two oil-price shocks led to continued price volatility in the market; short-term physical markets evolved, and the need to hedge emerged.

A group of energy and futures companies founded the IPE in 1980, and the first contract, for gas oil futures, was launched the following year. In June 1988, the IPE launched Brent Crude futures.

Since its inception, oil futures and latterly options have been traded in pits on the trading floor using the open outcry system. As business volumes have grown, the IPE has moved location several times to accommodate new pits and more traders.

The Exchange has experienced incremental growth, year-on-year for most of its history. Complexity, but also efficiency have increased as new trading instruments such as swaps, futures, and options have been developed.

== Contracts ==
Since 1997, the ICE Futures has expanded its offerings from Brent Crude and Gas Oil to include Natural Gas (1997), Electricity (2004), and ECX carbon financial instruments (2005). These expansions have allowed ICE Futures to offer a wider range of energy products. More advanced transactions are also now possible, due to cross- and multi-product transactions, which eliminate the need to use multiple markets or an adviser.

== See also ==
- List of futures exchanges
