= SuperDerivatives =

- Founded: 1999
- Founder: Dr. David Gershon
- Headquarters: United States

SuperDerivatives logo

SuperDerivatives (1999-2014) was an American financial services company. It created the first professional real time option pricing tool delivered over the internet. The option prices generated by SuperDerivatives reflected accurately the prices in the interbank broker market and the company generated worldwide transparency in option pricing and as a result drove the significant growth of the OTC option markets. The company was acquired by Intercontinental Exchange in 2014.

== Company ==
SuperDerivatives Inc. was founded in 2000 by Dr. David Gershon, previously global head of exotic derivatives at Barclays Capital in its headquarters in London, with the idea of generating transparency in option pricing. Gershon had developed his own proprietary model for option pricing which matched accurately to prices of thousands of options that traded in the interbank broker market. While many institutions traded options, the option market was opaque and only the large banks had access to the prices in the interbank market. No known model at that time was able to produce prices close enough to the market.

Gershon aimed to create transparency in option pricing among all financial institutions with the model he invented and in order to achieve transparency in the fastest possible way, he chose to deliver his pricing platform over the internet, which at that time was rather unusual. Dr. Yuval Levy, the London-based CTO of SuperDerivatives, managed all technology and product development of the company since inception until it was sold. In 2001, SuperDerivatives launched the first real time option pricing tool delivered over the internet. Within 2 years most of the banks that traded options around the world used the SuperDerivatives pricing system and the option pricing model was referred to by many as the “benchmark for options”. The availability of the system over the internet opened many new option markets such as in China, Indonesia, Thailand, Philippines, Turkey, Morocco, Dubai, Israel, Saudi Arabia, Mexico, Colombia, Poland, Russia, Slovenia, Slovakia. The users of the system included banks, hedge funds, corporations, brokers, central banks and auditors. The biggest contribution of SuperDerivatives was that the transparency it created enabled many new market makers and takers to participate actively in the Vanilla and Exotic options market and as a result the bid-ask spreads shrunk and the liquidity and volume rose dramatically. Within less than 5 years SuperDerivatives transformed the option market. The pricing tool became a rich platform for all professional derivatives users and In 2003 JPMorgan-Chase rolled out the SuperDerivatives pricing tool to all its traders and sales in the currency business. In 2004, SuperDerivatives started publishing implied volatility data from the OTC markets as a new options mark-to-market service. This was followed by the launch of an independent portfolio valuation service which allowed its customers to obtain the mark-to-market valuation at any cutoff time, around the clock. On October 10, 2010, the company released a cross-asset derivatives pricing, structuring and pre-trade analysis system, called SDX which combined its technology for currency, interest rates, equities, commodities, energy and credit derivatives it had used since 2005. In 2011 SuperDerivatives partnered with FXCM to create a multi-bank trading system for FX options called DCX. On December 12, 2012 the company launched a market data platform called DGX. DGX was a free text data system with self configuration.

== Mergers and acquisitions ==
In September 2014, Intercontinental Exchange announced that it had entered into a definitive agreement to acquire SuperDerivatives. The acquisition was said to accelerate the expansion of ICE's comprehensive multi-asset class clearing strategy. Terms of the all-cash transaction included a purchase price of approximately $350 million. Completion of the transaction was subject to regulatory approval and other customary closing conditions. The transaction successfully completed on 7 October 2014.
