= Simplified Instructional Computer =

Educational hypothetical computer

The Simplified Instructional Computer (abbreviated SIC) is a hypothetical computer system introduced in System Software: An Introduction to Systems Programming, by Leland Beck. Due to the fact that most modern microprocessors include subtle, complex functions for the purposes of efficiency, it can be difficult to learn systems programming using a real-world system. The Simplified Instructional Computer solves this by abstracting away these complex behaviors in favor of an architecture that is clear and accessible for those wanting to learn systems programming.

== SIC architecture ==
The SIC machine has basic addressing, storing most memory addresses in hexadecimal integer format. Similar to most modern computing systems, the SIC architecture stores all data in binary and uses the two's complement to represent negative values at the machine level. Memory storage in SIC consists of 8-bit bytes, and all memory addresses in SIC are byte addresses. Any three consecutive bytes form a 24-bit 'word' value, addressed by the location of the lowest numbered byte in the word value. Numeric values are stored as word values, and character values use the 8-bit ASCII system. The SIC machine does not support floating-point hardware and has at most 32,768 bytes of memory. There is also a more complicated machine built on top of SIC called the Simplified Instruction Computer with Extra Equipment (SIC/XE). The XE expansion of SIC adds a 48-bit floating point data type, an additional memory addressing mode, and extra memory (1 megabyte instead of 32,768 bytes) to the original machine. All SIC assembly code is upwards compatible with SIC/XE.

SIC machines have several registers, each 24 bits long and having both a numeric and character representation:

- A (0): Used for basic arithmetic operations; known as the accumulator register.
- X (1): Stores and calculates addresses; known as the index register.
- L (2): Used for jumping to specific memory addresses and storing return addresses; known as the linkage register.
- PC (8): Contains the address of the next instruction to execute; known as the program counter register.
- SW (9): Contains a variety of information, such as carry or overflow flags; known as the status word register.

In addition to the standard SIC registers, there are also four additional general-purpose registers specific to the SIC/XE machine:

- B (3): Used for addressing; known as the base register.
- S (4): No special use, general purpose register.
- T (5): No special use, general purpose register.
- F (6): Floating point accumulator register (This register is 48-bits instead of 24).

These five/nine registers allow the SIC or SIC/XE machine to perform most simple tasks in a customized assembly language. In the System Software book, this is used with a theoretical series of operation codes to aid in understanding the assemblers and linker-loaders required for the execution of assembly language code.

== Addressing modes for SIC and SIC/XE ==
The Simplified Instruction Computer has three instruction formats, and the Extra Equipment add-on includes a fourth. The instruction formats provide a model for memory and data management. Each format has a different representation in memory:

- Format 1: Consists of 8 bits of allocated memory to store instructions.
- Format 2: Consists of 16 bits of allocated memory to store 8 bits of instructions and two 4-bits segments to store operands.
- Format 3: Consists of 6 bits to store an instruction, 6 bits of flag values, and 12 bits of displacement.
- Format 4: Only valid on SIC/XE machines, consists of the same elements as format 3, but instead of a 12-bit displacement, stores a 20-bit address.

Both format 3 and format 4 have six-bit flag values in them, consisting of the following flag bits:

- n: Indirect addressing flag
- i: Immediate addressing flag
- x: Indexed addressing flag
- b: Base address-relative flag
- p: Program counter-relative flag
- e: Format 4 instruction flag

== Addressing modes for SIC/XE ==
- Rule 1:
  e = 0 : format 3
  e = 1 : format 4
  - format 3:
    b = 1, p = 0 (base relative)
    b = 0, p = 1 (pc relative)
    b = 0, p = 0 (direct addressing)
  - format 4:
    b = 0, p = 0 (direct addressing)
    x = 1 (index)
    i = 1, n = 0 (immediate)
    i = 0, n = 1 (indirect)
    i = 0, n = 0 (SIC)
    i = 1, n = 1 (SIC/XE for SIC compatible)
- Rule 2:
  i = 0, n =0 (SIC)
  b, p, e is part of the address.

== SIC assembly syntax ==
SIC uses a special assembly language with its own operation codes that hold the hex values needed to assemble and execute programs. A sample program is provided below to get an idea of what a SIC program might look like. In the code below, there are three columns. The first column represents a forwarded symbol that will store its location in memory. The second column denotes either a SIC instruction (opcode) or a constant value (BYTE or WORD). The third column takes the symbol value obtained by going through the first column and uses it to run the operation specified in the second column. This process creates an object code, and all the object codes are put into an object file to be run by the SIC machine.

       COPY   START  1000
       FIRST  STL    RETADR
       CLOOP  JSUB   RDREC
              LDA    LENGTH
              COMP   ZERO
              JEQ    ENDFIL
              JSUB   WRREC
              J      CLOOP
       ENDFIL LDA    EOF
              STA    BUFFER
              LDA    THREE
              STA    LENGTH
              JSUB   WRREC
              LDL    RETADR
              RSUB
       EOF    BYTE   C'EOF'
       THREE  WORD   3
       ZERO   WORD   0
       RETADR RESW   1
       LENGTH RESW   1
       BUFFER RESB   4096
       .
       .      SUBROUTINE TO READ RECORD INTO BUFFER
       .
       RDREC  LDX    ZERO
              LDA    ZERO
       RLOOP  TD     INPUT
              JEQ    RLOOP
              RD     INPUT
              COMP   ZERO
              JEQ    EXIT
              STCH   BUFFER,X
              TIX    MAXLEN
              JLT    RLOOP
       EXIT   STX    LENGTH
              RSUB
       INPUT  BYTE   X'F1'
       MAXLEN WORD   4096
       .
       .      SUBROUTINE TO WRITE RECORD FROM BUFFER
       .
       WRREC  LDX    ZERO
       WLOOP  TD     OUTPUT
              JEQ    WLOOP
              LDCH   BUFFER,X
              WD     OUTPUT
              TIX    LENGTH
              JLT    WLOOP
              RSUB
       OUTPUT BYTE   X'06'
              END    FIRST

If you were to assemble this program, you would get the object code depicted below. The beginning of each line consists of a record type and hex values for memory locations. For example, the top line is an 'H' record, the first 6 hex digits signify its relative starting location, and the last 6 hex digits represent the program's size. The lines throughout are similar, with each 'T' record consisting of 6 hex digits to signify that line's starting location, 2 hex digits to indicate the size (in bytes) of the line, and the object codes that were created during the assembly process.

       HCOPY 00100000107A
       T0010001E1410334820390010362810303010154820613C100300102A0C103900102D
       T00101E150C10364820610810334C0000454F46000003000000
       T0020391E041030001030E0205D30203FD8205D2810303020575490392C205E38203F
       T0020571C1010364C0000F1001000041030E02079302064509039DC20792C1036
       T002073073820644C000006
       E001000

== Sample program ==
Given below is a program illustrating data movement in SIC.

LDA FIVE
STA ALPHA
LDCH CHARZ
STCH C1

ALPHA RESW 1
FIVE WORD 5
CHARZ BYTE C'Z'
C1 RESB 1

== Emulating the SIC system ==
Since the SIC and SIC/XE machines are not real machines, the task of actually constructing a SIC emulator is often part of coursework in a systems programming class. The purpose of SIC is to teach introductory-level systems programmers or collegiate students how to write and assemble code below higher-level languages like C and C++. With that being said, there are some sources of SIC-emulating programs across the web, however infrequent they may be.

- An assembler and a simulator written by the author, Leland in Pascal is available at https://archive.org/details/sicsim
- SIC/XE Simulator And Assembler downloadable at https://sites.google.com/site/sarimohsultan/Projects/sic-xe-simulator-and-assembler
- SIC Emulator, Assembler and some example programs written for SIC downloadable at https://sourceforge.net/projects/sicvm/
- SicTools - virtual machine, simulator, assembler and linker for the SIC/XE computer available at https://jurem.github.io/SicTools/

== See also ==
- Computer
- MIX – Hypothetical computer by Donald Knuth
- System software
- Assembly language
- Processor register
- Virtual machine
