= Intercontinental Exchange =

American exchange and clearing house company

Intercontinental Exchange, Inc.
- Type: Public
- Traded as: NYSE: ICE; S&P 500 component
- ISIN: US45866F1049
- Industry: Financial services; Financial markets
- Founded: May 11, 2000; 26 years ago
- Founder: Jeffrey Sprecher
- Headquarters: Atlanta, Georgia, U.S.
- Key people: Jeffrey Sprecher (chair and CEO); Benjamin Jackson (President); Warren Gardiner (CFO); Lynn Martin (president, NYSE Group)
- Products: Clearing; Exchange Listing; Financial Data; Mortgage Technology
- Revenue: ▲US$9.931 billion (2025)
- Operating income: ▲US$4.929 billion (2025)
- Net income: ▲US$3.315 billion (2025)
- Total assets: ▼US$136.8 billion (2025)
- Total equity: ▲US$28.9 billion (2025)
- Number of employees: 12,844 (2025)
- Subsidiaries: New York Stock Exchange
- Website: ice.com
- Footnotes; Financials as of December 31, 2025

Intercontinental Exchange, Inc. (ICE) is an American multinational financial services company that operates global financial exchanges, including stock exchanges and futures exchanges, as well as clearing houses, and provides technology and services for mortgage loan origination, closing, and servicing.

The company operates three divisions: "Exchanges", which operates 13 regulated exchanges and six clearing houses (55% of 2025 net revenues); "Fixed Income and Data Services", which provides execution, clearing, and analytics services for trading in fixed income products (24% of 2025 net revenues); and "Mortgage Technology", which provides technology for mortgage loan origination, closing, and servicing (21% of 2025 net revenues). Within the company's exchanges division, the company receives transaction revenue from trading in stocks and options on stocks (39% of 2025 exchanges revenue), energy futures contracts and options (27% of 2025 exchanges revenue), interest rate futures and options (7% of 2025 exchanges revenue), agricultural and metals futures and options (3% of 2025 exchanges revenue), OTC energy products (5% of 2025 exchanges revenue), data and connectivity services (13% of 2025 exchanges revenue), and stock exchange listing fees (6% of 2025 exchanges revenue).

Exchanges owned by ICE include the New York Stock Exchange, the world's largest stock exchange in terms of total market capitalization of its listed companies; ICE futures exchanges in the United States, Canada, and Europe; the London International Financial Futures and Options Exchange (LIFFE) futures exchanges in Europe; equity options exchanges; and OTC exchanges for energy, credit products, and equities. Central clearing houses owned by ICE include ICE Clear U.S., ICE Clear Europe, ICE Clear Singapore, ICE Clear Credit, ICE Clear Netherlands, and ICE NGX. It also owns ICE Digital Trust, a digital asset custody business.

The company also owns 31% of Bakkt, 40% of Options Clearing Corporation, and 11% of Polymarket on a fully diluted basis.

== History ==
Jeffrey Sprecher was a power plant developer who spotted a need for a seamless market in natural gas used to fuel power stations. In the late 1990s, Sprecher acquired Continental Power Exchange, Inc. with the objective of developing an Internet-based platform to provide a more transparent and efficient market structure for over-the-counter energy commodity trading.

In May 2000, ICE was founded by Sprecher and backed by Goldman Sachs, Morgan Stanley, BP, Total, UniCredit, Shell, Deutsche Bank and Société Générale.

The new exchange increased price transparency, efficiency, liquidity, and had lower costs than manual trading. While the company's original focus was energy products (crude and refined oil, natural gas, power, and emissions), acquisitions subsequently expanded its activity into soft commodities (sugar, cotton and coffee), foreign exchange and equity index futures.

In a response to the 2008 financial crisis, Sprecher formed ICE US Trust, based in New York and now called ICE Clear Credit LLC, to serve as a limited-purpose bank, a clearing house for credit default swaps. Sprecher worked closely with the Federal Reserve to serve as its over-the-counter (OTC) derivatives clearing house. "US regulators were keen on the kind of clearing house for opaque over-the-counter (OTC) derivatives as a risk management device. In the absence of a central counterparty – which would guarantee pay-outs should a trading party be unable to do so – there was a high risk of massive market disruption."

The principal backers for ICE US Trust were the same financial institutions most affected by the crisis, the top nine of the world's largest banks (Goldman Sachs, Bank of America, Citi, Credit Suisse, Deutsche Bank, JPMorgan, Merrill Lynch, Morgan Stanley and UBS). Sprecher's clearing house cleared their global credit default swaps (CDS) in exchange for sharing profits with these banks. By September 30, 2008, the Financial Post warned that the "$54000bn credit derivatives market faced its biggest test in October 2008 as billions of dollars' worth of contracts on now-defaulted derivatives would be auctioned by the International Swaps and Derivatives Association . In his article in the Financial Post, Weitzman described ICE as a "US-based electronic futures exchange" which raised the stakes on October 30, 2008, in its effort to expand in the $54000 bn credit derivatives market.

By 2010, Intercontinental Exchange had cleared more than $10 trillion in credit default swaps (CDS) through its subsidiaries, ICE Trust CDS (now ICE Clear Credit). By 2017 Intercontinental Exchange had been named to the Fortune Future 50 determining the top 50 companies that are best positioned to adapt and deliver growth in a complex environment. ICE was also named to the Fortune 500 in June 2017 as the only exchange operator included in the ranking.

On September 6, 2019, Bloomberg reported that ICE was growing closer to offering Bitcoin futures trading, as "its Bakkt unit opens its digital-asset custody warehouse today to customers." On September 23, 2019, Bitcoin will be able to be acquired.

== Mergers, Acquisitions and Strategic Investments ==
Intercontinental Exchange has had a policy to grow through the acquisition of other exchanges, a number of these have been successful while others have failed due to concerns by regulators or others that the new company would have created a monopoly situation. The major acquisition and attempted acquisitions have included:

=== 2001: International Petroleum Exchange (IPE) ===
In June 2001, ICE expanded its business into futures trading by acquiring the London-based International Petroleum Exchange (IPE), now ICE Futures Europe, which operated Europe's leading open-outcry energy futures exchange. Since 2003, ICE has partnered with the Chicago Climate Exchange (CCX) to host its electronic marketplaces. In April 2005, the entire ICE portfolio of energy futures became fully electronic and ICE closed International Petroleum Exchange's high profile and historic trading floor.

=== 2007: New York Board of Trade (NYBOT) ===
ICE became a publicly traded company on November 16, 2005, and was added to the Russell 1000 Index on June 30, 2006. The company expanded rapidly in 2007, acquiring the New York Board of Trade (NYBOT), and ChemConnect (a chemical commodity market).

=== 2007: Chicago Board of Trade – (unsuccessful bid) ===
In March 2007 ICE made an unsuccessful $9.9 billion bid for the Chicago Board of Trade, which was instead acquired by the CME Group.

=== 2007: Winnipeg Commodity Exchange (WCE) ===
IntercontinentalExchange Inc., the "upstart Atlanta-based energy bourse" purchased the privately held 120-year-old Winnipeg Commodity Exchange, known for its canola futures contract, for $40 million.

The Winnipeg Commodity Exchange (WCE) was renamed ICE Futures Canada as of January 1, 2008. In 2004, the Winnipeg Commodity Exchange had "closed its open-outcry trading floor" becoming "the first North American agricultural futures exchange to trade exclusively on an electronic platform" by trading via the "Chicago Board of Trade's electronic platform, and [using] clearing services from the Kansas City Board of Trade. IntercontinentalExchange converted Winnipeg Commodity Exchange contracts to the IntercontinentalExchange platform. IntercontinentalExchange maintained an office and "small core staff" in Winnipeg, Manitoba. The Manitoba Securities Commission oversee its operations.

=== 2008: Creditex ===
In June 2008, ICE announced that it had entered into a definitive merger agreement to acquire Creditex Group Inc. (Creditex). The transaction consideration totaled $625 million comprising approximately $565 million in ICE common stock and $60 million in cash, as well as a working capital adjustment to be finalized at closing. Upon the closing of the transaction, Creditex Group became a wholly owned subsidiary of ICE, operating under the Creditex name.

=== 2008: TSX Group's Natural Gas Exchange Partnership ===
In January 2008, ICE partnered with Canada's TSX Group's Natural Gas Exchange, expanding their offering to clearing and settlement services for physical OTC natural gas contracts.

=== 2010: Climate Exchange ===
In April 2010, ICE acquired Climate Exchange PLC for 395 million pounds ($622 million) and European Climate Exchange (ECX) as part of its purchase. Exchange-traded emissions products were first offered by the European Climate Exchange (ECX), which was established in 2005, by listing products on the ICE Futures Europe's trading platform. ICE Futures Europe is the leading market for carbon dioxide (CO_{2}) emissions. ICE's ECX products comply with the requirements of the European Union Emission Trading Scheme.

=== 2013: NYSE Euronext ===
In February 2011, in the wake of an announced merger of NYSE Euronext with Deutsche Börse, speculation developed that ICE and Nasdaq could mount a counter-bid of their own for NYSE Euronext. ICE was thought to be looking to acquire the American exchange's derivatives business, Nasdaq its cash equities business. As of the time of the speculation, "NYSE Euronext's market value was $9.75 billion. Nasdaq was valued at $5.78 billion, while ICE was valued at $9.45 billion." Late in the month, Nasdaq was reported to be considering asking either ICE or the Chicago Mercantile Exchange (CME) to join in what would probably be an $11–12 billion counterbid for NYSE. On April 1, ICE and Nasdaq made an $11.3 billion offer which was rejected April 10 by NYSE. Another week later, ICE and Nasdaq sweetened their offer, including a $.17 increase per share to $42.67 and a $350 million breakup fee if the deal were to encounter regulatory trouble. The two said the offer was a $2 billion (21%) premium over the Deutsche offer and that they had fully committed financing of $3.8 billion from lenders to finance the deal.

The Justice Department, also in April, "initiated an antitrust review of the proposal, which would have brought nearly all U.S. stock listings under a merged Nasdaq-NYSE." In May, saying it "became clear that we would not be successful in securing regulatory approval", the Nasdaq and ICE withdrew their bid. The European Commission then blocked the Deutsche merger on February 1, 2012, citing the fact that the merged company would have a near monopoly.

In December 2012, ICE announced it would buy NYSE Euronext (this time without the involvement of Nasdaq) for $8.2 billion, pending regulatory approval. Jeffrey Sprecher would retain his position as chairman and CEO. The boards of directors of both ICE and NYSE Euronext approved the acquisition, which took place in 2013.

In 2014, ICE spun off Euronext, keeping NYSE and LIFFE, renaming it ICE Futures Europe.

=== 2015: SuperDerivatives Inc. ===
In September 2014, ICE announced that it had agreed to acquire SuperDerivatives, a provider of risk management analytics, financial market data and valuation services. SuperDerivatives was purchased for $350 million on October 7, 2014.

=== 2015: Investment in Coinbase ===
In January 2015, ICE announced that its wholly-owned subsidiary, The New York Stock Exchange, has made a minority investment in Coinbase, participated in Coinbase’s Series C $75 million funding round. In April 2021 NYSE sold its 1.4% stake in the newly listed Coinbase for $1.2 billion.

=== 2015: Interactive Data Corporation (IDC) ===
In October 2015, ICE announced that it had entered into a definitive agreement to acquire Interactive Data Corporation (IDC), a provider of financial market data, analytics, from Silver Lake, involved in technology investing, and Warburg Pincus, a private equity firm focused on growth investing. The acquisition was valued at approximately $5.2 billion, including $3.65 billion in cash and $1.55 billion in ICE common stock, and builds on ICE's global market data growth strategy by expanding the markets served, adding technology platforms and increasing new data and valuation services. Completion of the transaction was subject to regulatory approval and other customary closing conditions. The transaction completed on December 14, 2015.

=== 2015: Trayport and subsequent divestment ===
In December 2015, ICE acquired Trayport for $650 million from GFI Group. Trayport provides a trading technology platform that serves brokers, exchanges, clearing houses and trading participants, primarily in the European utility markets. Approximately 70%-80% of European utility trades flow through its platform.

Following the acquisition, the Competition and Markets Authority (CMA) called in the merger for review. In October 2016 it announced its decision to require ICE to sell Trayport, having ruled that the merger could lead to a substantial lessening of competition. ICE challenged the decision in the Competition Appeal Tribunal (CAT), but the CAT upheld the CMA's decision. As a result, ICE sold Trayport to TMX Group in October 2017, in exchange for certain TMX Group assets and cash of £350 million. The CMA's ruling against ICE was the first time CMA had required that a company sell an asset that it had already bought.

=== 2016: Standard & Poor's Securities Evaluations (SPSE) ===
In March 2016, ICE agreed to acquire Standard & Poor's Securities Evaluations, Inc. (SPSE) and Credit Market Analysis (CMA), two assets under the S&P Global Market Intelligence business unit from McGraw Hill Financial. Most terms of the agreement were not disclosed. In October 2016 it had completed its all-cash acquisition.

=== 2017: TMX Atrium ===
In February 2017, ICE announced it had entered an agreement to acquire TMX Atrium, an extranet and wireless services business from TMX Group. Terms of the agreement were not disclosed, and the transaction is expected to close within 90 days, subject to regulatory approvals. The financial impact of the transaction will be immaterial and was included in ICE's financial guidance for 2017.

=== 2017: BofA Merrill Lynch Global Research Index Platform (BofAML) ===
In February 2017, ICE announced that it had entered into a definitive agreement to acquire the Global Research division's index platform from Bank of America Merrill Lynch. The BofAML indices are the second most used fixed income indices by assets under management (AUM) globally, and upon closing, the AUM benchmarked against the combined fixed income index business of ICE will be nearly $1 trillion. Upon closing, the indices will be re-branded as the ICE BofAML indices. The terms of the agreement were not disclosed, and the transaction is expected to be completed in the second half of 2017. The financial impact of the transaction is expected to be immaterial in 2017. In October 2017 ICE announced it has completed its acquisition. Furthermore, in August 2019, it announced it had entered into an agreement to acquire a family of fixed income volatility indices, including the prominent Merrill Lynch Option Volatility Estimate (“MOVE”) family of indices.

=== 2017: Euroclear ===
In October 2017, ICE announced it had acquired a 4.7% stake in Euroclear Group for EUR 275 million. ICE anticipates having one representative join the Board of Euroclear. Euroclear is a leading provider of post-trade services, including settlement, central securities depositories and related services for cross-border transactions across asset classes. It is understood ICE increased its stake to 10% in early 2018.

=== 2017: Virtu BondPoint ===
In October 2017, ICE announced it had entered into an agreement to acquire Virtu BondPoint from Virtu Financial for $400 million in cash. The acquisition was reportedly completed on January 2, 2018, as announced by ICE. BondPoint is an integrated, automated platform offering additional fixed income execution services and one of the broadest sets of fixed income instruments.

=== 2018: Chicago Stock Exchange (CHX) ===
In April 2018, ICE announced that it had entered into an agreement to acquire the Chicago Stock Exchange (CHX), a full-service stock exchange, including trading, data and corporate listings services. The transaction is expected to close in the second quarter of 2018, subject to regulatory approvals. Terms of the transaction were not disclosed, and the financial impact will not be material to ICE or impact capital return plans.

=== 2018: TMC Bonds LLC ===
In May 2018, ICE announced that it had entered into an agreement to acquire TMC Bonds LLC for $685 million in cash. Established in 2000, TMC Bonds is a fixed income marketplace, supporting anonymous trading in various asset classes including Municipals, Corporates, Treasuries, Agencies and Certificates of Deposit. The transaction is expected to close in the second half of 2018, subject to customary regulatory and anti-trust approvals, and is not expected to materially impact 2018 financial results or capital returns.

=== 2018: Merscorp Holding, Inc ===
In October 2018, ICE announced that it had acquired the remaining equity of Merscorp Holding, Inc., owner of Mortgage Electronic Registration Systems, Inc. (MERS). Merscorp owns and operates the MERS System, a national electronic registry that tracks the changes in servicing rights and beneficial ownership interests in U.S.-based mortgage loans. ICE had owned a majority equity interest in MERS since 2016. Earlier this month, ICE successfully moved the MERS System infrastructure to the ICE Mahwah data center, an integral requirement for completing the final acquisition of the business. The price and terms of the transaction were not disclosed and will not be material to ICE's earnings or have an impact on capital return plans.

=== 2019: Simplifile, LC ===
In May 2019, ICE announced that it had agreed to acquire Simplifile, LC. Simplifile operates a network connecting agents and jurisdictions involved with residential mortgage records.

ICE will pay $335 million to acquire Simplifile, which is based in Provo, Utah and has no debt. The transaction is expected to close in the third quarter of 2019. Upon closing, Simplifile, which has approximately 200 employees, will continue to be based in Provo and operate under the Simplifile name.

=== 2020: Ellie Mae ===
In August 2020, ICE announced that it had entered into a definitive agreement to acquire Ellie Mae, a cloud-based platform provider for the mortgage finance industry. The transaction with Ellie Mae, a portfolio company of Thoma Bravo, a leading private equity investment firm, valued Ellie Mae at approximately $11 billion. The deal, following ICE's taking a majority stake in MERS in 2016, purchasing the remainder in 2018, and acquiring Simplifile in 2019, made ICE and its growing ICE Mortgage Technology, a leading provider of end-to-end electronic workflow products for the U.S. residential mortgage industry. The transaction completed successfully in September 2020 after regulatory approval.

=== 2021: risQ ===
In December 2021, ICE acquired risQ, a geospatial and climate data modeling start-up company, after announcing partnerships with the company to develop climate risk and ESG analytics models for municipal bond markets in January 2020 and mortgage-backed securities markets in March 2021.

=== 2022: Black Knight ===
In May 2022, ICE announced that it had entered into a definitive agreement to acquire Black Knight, Inc., a software, data and analytics company that serves the housing finance continuum. The cash and stock transaction values Black Knight at $85 per share, or a market value of $13.1 billion. In April 2023, the Federal Trade Commission petitioned a federal court to issue a preliminary injunction to halt the acquisition.

In August 2023, ICE announced that they had entered into an Agreement Containing Consent Orders (the “ACCO”) with the Bureau of Competition of the Federal Trade Commission (the “FTC”) regarding their pending acquisition of Black Knight. The ACCO contains an agreed form of consent order that will be submitted to the FTC for acceptance and approval. Based on a previously announced Timing Agreement entered into among ICE, Black Knight and the FTC on August 6, 2023, ICE was permitted to complete its acquisition of Black Knight following 11:59 p.m. Eastern Time on the tenth calendar day after the entry into the ACCO.

In September 2023, the parties closed the acquisition and completed the previously announced divestitures of Black Knight's Empower and Optimal Blue businesses to subsidiaries of Constellation Software Inc.

=== 2025: American Financial Exchange (AFX) ===
On January 8, 2025, ICE announced that it acquired the American Financial Exchange (AFX), an electronic exchange for direct lending and borrowing for American banks and financial institutions and operator of the credit-sensitive American Interbank Offered Rate (AMERIBOR), from 7RIDGE. The acquisition was not expected to have a material impact on ICE’s 2025 financial results or on ICE’s deleveraging or capital return plans.

=== 2025: Investment in Polymarket ===
On October 7, 2025 ICE announced it would invest up to $2 billion in Polymarket at an $8 billion valuation, and that it would become a distributor of Polymarket's event-driven data.

=== 2026: Investment in OKX ===
On March 5, 2026 ICE announced a strategic relationship and investment in OKX, a blockchain technology and trading company with a global user base, estimated at around 120 million people. As part of the agreement, ICE reportedly invested $200 million in OKX at a valuation of approximately $25 billion. The partnership also provides ICE with a seat on OKX’s Board of Directors and establishes a broader collaboration focused on combining OKX’s blockchain infrastructure and global reach with ICE’s market technology, regulatory expertise, and institutional network.

=== 2026: MarketAxess ===
On July 30, 2026 ICE announced that it had entered into a definitive agreement to acquire MarketAxess Holdings Inc., a preeminent electronic trading platform for global institutional fixed income markets. Under the terms of the agreement, ICE will acquire all outstanding shares of MarketAxess for $167 per share in cash, representing a 33% premium to MarketAxess’s closing price as of July 29, 2026, representing an equity value of approximately $6.0 billion and a total enterprise value of approximately $5.7 billion. Transaction unanimously approved by the Boards of Directors of both companies; expected to close in the first half of 2027, subject to receipt of MarketAxess stockholder approval, applicable regulatory clearances, and customary closing conditions.

=== 2026: Investment in Trade[XYZ] ===
On October 29, 2026, ICE announced a definitive agreement and strategic investment in Trade[XYZ], a deployer of real-world-asset perpetual futures markets built on the decentralized derivatives platform Hyperliquid. Under the agreement, ICE will serve as the exclusive operator of Trade[XYZ]’s regulated markets and intends to seek regulatory approval for a new, dedicated retail market and clearing structure in the United States. The structure would offer KYC/AML-compliant perpetual contracts referencing assets such as equities, commodities, and currencies, and would operate separately from ICE’s institutional futures and clearing business. Distribution is expected to run through futures commission merchants and other retail platforms, including ICE’s joint venture with OKX. ICE described its stake as a minority position that it does not expect to materially affect its 2026 adjusted financial results, and the financial terms were not disclosed.

== Operations ==
ICE provides exchange trading and clearing services in a number of different markets. Its main products include:

- Exchange traded futures and options
  - Agriculture
  - Financials
  - Crude Oil and Refined
  - Electricity
  - Natural Gas/Liquids
  - UK Natural Gas
  - Other
- Over-the-counter instruments (ICE OTC)
  - Crude Oil and Refined
  - Natural Gas
  - Electricity

The company is split into the following subsidiaries:

- Markets
  - ICE Futures U.S.
  - ICE Futures Europe – one of the world's largest energy futures and options exchanges
  - ICE Futures Singapore
  - ICE Endex
  - ICE OTC Energy
  - ICE Swap Trade & Creditex
  - ICE Bonds
- Clearing
  - ICE Clear U.S.
  - ICE Clear Europe
  - ICE NGX
  - ICE Clear Singapore
  - ICE Clear Netherlands
  - ICE Clear Credit

== ICE Data Services ==
In June 2016 Intercontinental Exchange introduced the expanded ICE Data Services, which combined exchange data, valuations, analytics, and other software used by the New York Stock Exchange (NYSE), SuperDerivatives and Interactive Data (IDC).

ICE originally formed its ICE Data subsidiary in 2003, recognizing the rising demand for exchange data as markets became increasingly automated. ICE continues to invest in its data services to address evolving customer needs driven by regulatory reform, market fragmentation, passive investing and indexation, along with increased demand for data capacity and security, and independent valuations. Their customers include global financial institutions, asset managers, commercial hedging firms, risk managers, corporate issuers and individual investors.

ICE Data Services has offices in California, New York, Chicago, Bedford MA, London, Rome, Dublin, Tel Aviv, Hong Kong, Singapore, Tokyo, Hyderabad and Melbourne.

== See also ==
- List of futures exchanges
- Securities market participants (United States)
- CCP Global
