= Oil megaprojects (2011) =

Following is a list of Oil megaprojects in the year 2011, projects that propose to bring more than 20,000 barrels per day (3,200 m^{3}/d) of new liquid fuel capacity to market with the first production of fuel. This is part of the Wikipedia summary of Oil Megaprojects.

== Quick links to other years ==
Overview	2003	2004	2005	2006	2007	2008	2009	2010	2011	2012	2013	2014	2015	2016	2017	2018	2019	2020

== Detailed list of projects for 2011 ==
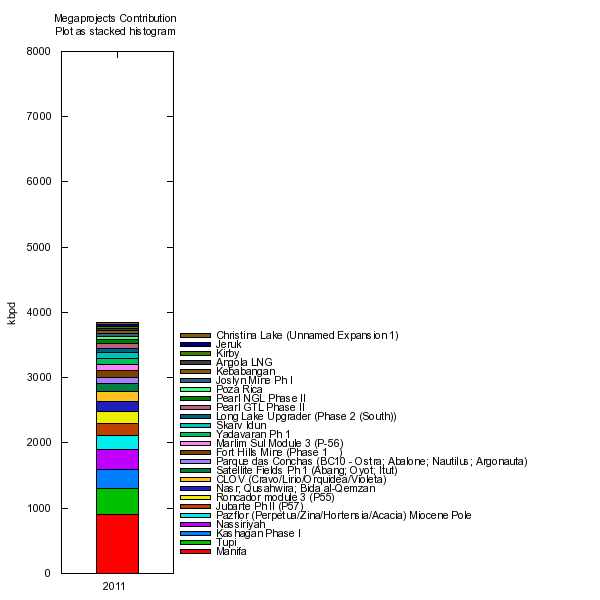
2011 gross new supply addition (updated 29 December 2007)

Terminology

- Year Startup: year of first oil. put specific date if available.
- Operator: company undertaking the project.
- Area: onshore (LAND), offshore (OFF), offshore deep water (ODW), tar sands (TAR).
- Type: liquid category (i.e. Natural Gas Liquids, Natural gas condensate, Crude oil)
- Grade: oil quality (light, medium, heavy, sour) or API gravity
- 2P resvs: 2P (proven + probable) oil reserves in giga barrels (Gb).
- GOR: The ratio of produced gas to produced oil, commonly abbreviated GOR.
- Peak year: year of the production plateau/peak.
- Peak: maximum production expected (thousand barrels/day).
- Discovery: year of discovery.
- Capital investment: expected capital cost; FID (Final Investment Decision) - If no FID, then normally no project development contracts can be awarded. For many projects, a FEED stage (Front End Engineering Design) precedes the FID.
- Notes: comments about the project (footnotes).
- Ref: list of sources.

Country	Project name	Year startup	Operator	Area	Type	Grade	2P resvs	GOR	Peak Year	Peak	Discovery	Capital Inv.	Notes	Ref
OPEC
Algeria	Block 405b MLE	2011	Eni		NGL					20				
Algeria	IAN/EOR	2011	Eni		Crude					15				
Angola	Angola LNG	5/2011	Chevron		NGL					35				
Angola	Block 17 Pazflor (Perpetua; Zinia; Hortensia; Acacia) Miocene Pole	5/2011	Total	ODW	Crude		1.500			200	2003–2005			
Iran	South Pars Ph 9; 10	2011	NIOC	LAND	Condensate NGL				2011	80				
Iraq	Ahdab	2011	CNPC		Crude	24-27 API	1.0		2014	115				
Iraq	Halfaya	2011	Joint		Crude	23-31 API	4.100		2016	532				
Libya	A1-47/02	2011	LNOC		Crude					50		No FID		
Nigeria	Escravos GTL	2011	Chevron		GTL					34				
Nigeria	Ofon Ph 2	2011	NNPC; Total	OFF	Crude	Light	0.350			60				
Nigeria	OML 58 Exp	2011	Total		Condensate	Light			2011	15				
Nigeria	Satellite Fields Ph 1 (Abang; Oyot; Itut)	2011	Exxon		Crude	Light				125				
Nigeria	Ukot; Usan; Togo	5/2011	Total		Crude	Light	0.700			150	2000–2005			
Qatar	ExxonMobil GTL	2011	Exxon		Products	Diesel				0			Project cancelled, was 165 kbd	
Qatar	Pearl GTL Phase I	2011	Shell		Products	Diesel				70				
Qatar	Pearl NGL Phase I	2011	Shell		NGL					60				
Qatar	Qatargas 4 Train 7	2011	QP/Shell		Condensate	Light				40				
UAE	Qusahwira; Bida al-Qemzan; Mender	2011	ADNOC/ADCO		Crude					75				
Venezuela	Orinoco Carabobo I	2011	PDVSA		Crude	7-10 API	5.7		2014	200			no FID	
Non-OPEC
Australia	Cossack Exp	2011	Woodside Petroleum	OFF	Crude				2012	25				
Australia	Oliver	2011	Stuart	OFF	Crude		0.020			10				
Australia	Turrum; Kipper	2011	ExxonMobil	OFF	Gas, Cond, Oil					20				
Brazil	Jubarte Ph II (P57)	7/2011	Petrobras	ODW	Crude	17				180				
Brazil	Marlim Sul Module 3 (P-56)	7/2011	Petrobras	ODW		heavy oil				100				
Brazil	Peregrino	2/2011	StatoilHydro	OFF	Crude	Heavy	0.5		2012	100				
Cameroon	MLHP-7	2011	BowLeven	OFF	Condensate		0.025			20		No FID		
Canada	Christina Lake (Phase 1D)	2011		LAND	Bitumen	Tar Sands				30			In-Situ, Application	
Canada	Kirby	2011	CNRL	LAND	Bitumen	Tar sands			2012	30			In-Situ, Approved	
Canada	Christina Lake (Unnamed Expansion 1)	2011	EnCana	LAND	Bitumen	Tar Sands				30			In-Situ, Announced	
Canada	MacKay River Ph 2	2011	Petro-Canada		Synthetic crude					35				
China	Block 22/12	2011	CNOOC Roc Oil	OFF	Crude		0.06		2011	20		No FID		
East Timor	Kitan	2011	Eni		Crude		0.04			20				
Gabon	Anguille Exp	2011	Total	OFF	Crude		0.15		2014	20				
Indonesia	Banyu Urip (CEPU block) Ph 2	2011	ExxonMobil		Crude	heavy sour	0.600		2013	125	2001			
Italy	Tempa Rossa	2011	Total		Crude	Heavy	0.200			50				
Mexico	Poza Rica	2011	Pemex	LAND	Crude		0.292		2011	50				
Netherlands	Schoonebeek EOR	2011	NAM	LAND	Crude	25 API	0.350		2011	20		$US 0.5B		
Norway	Skarv Idun	8/2011	BP	OFF	Gas - condensate		0.125		2011	80	1998			
Norway	Trestakk	2011		OFF	Crude					50			No FID	
Peru	Block 67 (Paiche; Dorado; Pirana)	2011	Perenco	LAND	Crude	Heavy	0.3			50				
Russia	Prirazlomnoye	2011	Gazprom	OFF	Crude		0.610		2013	130	1989			
Russia	Sakhalin 1 Arkutun Dagi	2011	ExxonMobil	OFF	Crude					75				
Russia	Sakhalin 1 Odoptu	2011	ExxonMobil	OFF	Crude					35				
Russia	Talakan Ph 2	2011	Surgutneftegaz	LAND	Crude					80			No FID	
Russia	Uvat Group Ph 2	2011	TNK-BP	LAND	Crude		0.75		2013	60				
Russia	Vankor field Phase 2	2011	TNK-BP Rosneft	LAND	Crude		2.7		2017	105	1988			
Russia	Yurubcheno Tokhomskoye	2011	Rosneft	LAND	Crude				2014	100				
United States	Nikaitchuq	2011	Eni	OFF	Crude		0.18		2010	25			$US 1.45B	
United States	Prudhoe Bay West	2011		OFF	Crude					50				
United States	Droshky; Ozona	2011	Marathon	ODW	Crude	30 API	0.08		2012	40	2007			
United States	Liberty	2011	BP	LAND	Crude		0.10		2011	20				
Vietnam	Chim Sao (Blackbird); Dua	2011	Premier	OFF	Crude		0.080			30				
