= Oil megaprojects (2008) =

This page summarizes projects that brought more than 20,000 barrels per day (3,200 m^{3}/d) of new liquid fuel capacity to market with the first production of fuel beginning in 2008. This is part of the Wikipedia summary of Oil Megaprojects.

== Quick links to other years ==
Overview	2003	2004	2005	2006	2007	2008	2009	2010	2011	2012	2013	2014	2015	2016	2017	2018	2019	2020

== Detailed project table for 2008 ==
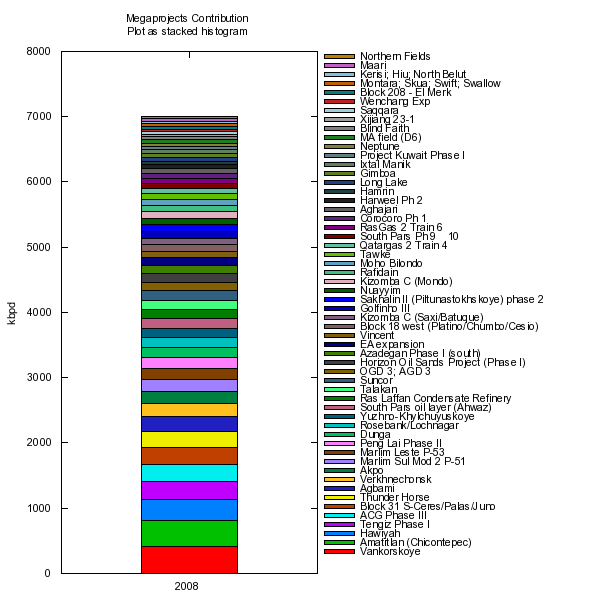
2008 gross new supply addition (updated 29 December 2007)

Terminology

- Year Startup: year of first oil. put specific date if available.
- Operator: company undertaking the project.
- Area: onshore (LAND), offshore (OFF), offshore deep water (ODW), tar sands (TAR).
- Type: liquid category (i.e. Natural Gas Liquids, Natural gas condensate, Crude oil)
- Grade: oil quality (light, medium, heavy, sour) or API gravity
- 2P resvs: 2P (proven + probable) oil reserves in giga barrels (Gb).
- GOR: The ratio of produced gas to produced oil, commonly abbreviated GOR.
- Peak year: year of the production plateau/peak.
- Peak: maximum production expected (thousand barrels/day).
- Discovery: year of discovery.
- Capital investment: expected capital cost; FID (Final Investment Decision) - If no FID, then normally no project development contracts can be awarded. For many projects, a FEED stage (Front End Engineering Design) precedes the FID.
- Notes: comments about the project (footnotes).
- Ref: list of sources.

Country	Project name	Year startup	Operator	Area	Type	Grade	2P resvs	GOR	Peak Year	Peak	Discovery	Capital Inv.	Notes	Ref
OPEC
Angola	Block 15 Kizomba C (Mondo)	1/2008	ExxonMobil	OFF	Crude		0.590			100	1998–2000			
Angola	Block 15 Kizomba C (Saxi; Batuque)	7/2008	ExxonMobil	OFF	Crude		0.310			100	1998–2000			
Indonesia	North Duri Area 12	11/2008	Chevron	LAND	Crude	Heavy			2012	34				
Iran	Azadegan Phase I (south)	2/2008	NIOC	LAND	Crude	Light & Heavy	5.200		2012	160	1999			
Iran	Aghajari Exp	4/2008	NIOC	LAND	Crude EOR				2010	120				
Iran	Darkhovin Ph 2 (Masjid; Suleiman)	1/2008	Eni NIOC	LAND	Crude	39 API			2008	110				
Iraq	Kirkuk (Khurmala Dome)	7/2008	KNOC	LAND	Crude	35 API			2009	100	1927			
Iraq	Tawke	7/2008	DNO	LAND	Crude		0.230		2009	50				
Kuwait	Project Kuwait Phase I	12/2008	KOC	LAND	Crude	Heavy			2012	50		No FID		
Nigeria	EA expansion	11/2008	Shell	OFF	Crude					80				
Nigeria	Agbami	7/2008	Chevron	ODW	Crude	47.2 API	1.0		2010	230		$US 5.2B		
Nigeria	EA NGL 2 (Oso)	11/2008	ExxonMobil	OFF	NGL		0.275		2008	40		$US 1.3B		
Saudi Arabia	AFK Ph 1 (Abu Hadriya; Fadhili; Khursaniyah)	9/2008	Saudi Aramco	LAND	Crude	Light			2008	300	1956			
Saudi Arabia	Hawiyah	9/2008	Saudi Aramco	LAND	NGL	NGL			2009	310	1953			
Venezuela	Corocoro Ph 1	1/2008	PDVSA	OFF	Crude	24 API	0.45		2009	70				
Non-OPEC
Australia	Angel	10/2008	North West Shelf Venture	OFF	Condensate	Light			2008	50				
Australia	Vincent	8/2008	Woodside	OFF	Crude	17 API	0.073		2008	30	1998			
Azerbaijan	ACG Phase III (Gunashli)	4/2008	BP	OFF	Crude		0.540			260	1970–1979			
Brazil	Badejo-Siri (FPSO Cidade de Rio das Ostras)	4/2008	Petrobras	OFF	Crude	13 API				15				
Brazil	Cachalote Pilot (Baleia Franca)	12/2008	Petrobras	ODW	Crude	19-23 API	0.35			25				
Brazil	Marlim Leste P-53	11/2008	Petrobras	ODW	Crude	19-20 API			2010	180	1987			
Canada	Long Lake Upgrader Ph 1	8/2008	OPTI /Nexen	LAND	Bitumen	Tar Sands				60			Mining, Upgrading, in construction	
Canada	Millennium Coker Unit	2008	Suncor	LAND	Bitumen	Tar sands				30				
Canada	Horizon Oil Sands Project (Phase I)	12/2008	Canadian Natural Resources	LAND	Bitumen	Tar sands				110		CA$7.7 B	Mining&Upgrading, first phase at 135 kbpd	
Canada	Christina Lake Ph 1B	9/2008	EnCana	LAND	Bitumen	Tar Sands				10			In-Situ, Approved	
Canada	Christina Lake Ph 2	8/2008	MEG Energy (CNOOC interest)	LAND	Bitumen	Tar Sands				20			In-Situ, Approved	
Canada	Jackfish Ph 1	3/2008	Devon Energy	LAND	Bitumen	Tar sands	0.600		2009	30		$730 mln		
China	Erdos CTL Ph 1	10/2008	Shenhua	LAND	Products	Diesel				20				
China	Tahe Exp	2008	Sinopec	LAND	Crude				2010	100	2007			
China	Wenchang Exp	7/2008	CNOOC	OFF	Crude					40				
China	Xijiang 23-1	6/2008	CNOOC	OFF	Crude				2009	40	2003			
Congo	Moho Bilondo	4/2008	Total	ODW	Crude		0.23		2010	90				
Egypt	Saqqara	3/2008	BP	LAND	Crude					40				
India	MA field (KG-D6)	9/2008	Reliance	ODW	Crude	42 API	0.14		2009	40				
Kazakhstan	Dunga	3/2008	Maersk	LAND	Crude		0.4			150				
Kazakhstan	Komsomolskoe	5/2008	Petrom	LAND						10				
Mexico	(Chicontepec) Exp 1	2008	Pemex	LAND		Heavy	2.287		2014	200				
Mexico	Antonio J Bermudez Exp	5/2008	Pemex	LAND			1.867		5/2008	20				
Mexico	Bellota Chinchorro Exp	5/2008	Pemex	LAND			0.250		5/2008	20				
Mexico	Ixtal Manik	2008	Pemex	OFF			0.177		2008	55				
Mexico	Jujo Tecominoacan Exp	2008	Pemex	LAND			0.854		2008	15				
Norway	Alvheim; Volund; Vilje	6/2008	Marathon	OFF	Crude		0.205		2009	100				
Norway	Volve	2/2008	StatoilHydro	OFF	Crude		0.079		2009	35				
Oman	Mukhaizna EOR Ph 1	2008	Occidental		Crude	16 API	1		2009	40				
Philippines	Galoc	10/2008	GPC	OFF	Crude	35 API	0.030		2008	15	1981			
Russia	Talakan Ph 1	10/2008	Surgutneftegaz	LAND	Crude				2010	60				
Russia	Verkhnechonsk Ph 1 (early oil)	10/2008	TNK-BP Rosneft	LAND	Crude		1.480		2009	20	1978			
Russia	Yuzhno-Khylchuyuskoye "YK" Ph 1	8/2008	Lukoil ConocoPhillips	LAND	Petroleum	35.3 API	0.5		2009	75	1981			
Thailand	Bualuang	8/2008	Salamander	OFF	Crude	27 API	0.02		2008	10	1992			
UK	Britannia Satellites (Callanish; Brodgar)	7/2008	ConocoPhillips	OFF	Crude					25				
United States	Blind Faith	11/2008	Chevron	ODW	Crude		0.06		2009	45				
United States	Neptune	7/2008	BHP Billiton	OFF	Crude		0.05		2008	25				
United States	Oooguruk	6/2008	Pioneer	OFF	Crude		0.09		2011	15				
United States	Qannik	7/2008	ConocoPhillips	LAND	Crude	30 API			2009	4	2006			
United States	Thunder Horse	6/2008	BP	ODW	Crude		1.0		2009	210	1999–2001			
United States	Ursa Princess Exp	1/2008	Shell	ODW	Crude					30				
Vietnam	Ca Ngu Vang (Golden Tuna)	7/2008	HVJOC	ODW	Crude					15				
Vietnam	Su Tu Vang	10/2008	Cuu Long Joint	OFF	Crude					40	2001			
Vietnam	Song Doc	12/2008	Talisman	OFF	Crude		0.02			10				
