= Oil megaprojects (2014) =

This page summarizes projects that propose to bring more than 20,000 barrels per day (3,200 m^{3}/d) of new liquid fuel capacity to market with the first production of fuel beginning in 2014. This is part of the Wikipedia summary of Oil Megaprojects.

== Quick links to other years ==
Overview	2003	2004	2005	2006	2007	2008	2009	2010	2011	2012	2013	2014	2015	2016	2017	2018	2019	2020

== Detailed list of projects for 2014 ==
Terminology

- Year Startup: year of first oil. put specific date if available.
- Operator: company undertaking the project.
- Area: onshore (LAND), offshore (OFF), offshore deep water (ODW), tar sands (TAR).
- Type: liquid category (i.e. Natural Gas Liquids, Natural gas condensate, Crude oil)
- Grade: oil quality (light, medium, heavy, sour) or API gravity
- 2P resvs: 2P (proven + probable) oil reserves in giga barrels (Gb).
- GOR: The ratio of produced gas to produced oil, commonly abbreviated GOR.
- Peak year: year of the production plateau/peak.
- Peak: maximum production expected (thousand barrels/day).
- Discovery: year of discovery.
- Capital investment: expected capital cost; FID (Final Investment Decision) - If no FID, then normally no project development contracts can be awarded. For many projects, a FEED stage (Front End Engineering Design) precedes the FID.
- Notes: comments about the project (footnotes).
- Ref: list of sources.

Country	Project name	Year startup	Operator	Area	Type	Grade	2P resvs	GOR	Peak Year	Peak	Discovery	Capital Inv.	Notes	Ref
OPEC
Algeria	Bir Seba	2014	PVEP Joint		Crude		0.180		2014	20				
Algeria	Gassi Touil	2014	Sonatrach	LAND	Condensate					30				
Algeria	Takouazet	2014	Rosneft		Crude				2014	50				
Algeria	Hassi Messaoud(Hassi Ferfa + Hassi Dzabat)	2014	Sonatrach		Crude					75				
Angola	Block 14 Lucapa	2014	Chevron	ODW	Crude					100	2006			
Angola	Block 14 Malange Pinda	2014	Chevron	ODW	Crude					40	2007			
Angola	Block 17 CLOV (Cravo; Lirio; Orquidea; Violeta)	2014	Total	ODW	Crude					160				
Angola	West Hub project (Sangos; N'Goma; Cinguvu)	2014	Eni	ODW	Crude					80				
Iran	Ferdows Golshan	2014	SKS Ventures		NGL					70				
Iran	Kharg NGL	2014	NIOC	LAND	NGL					85				
Iran	South Pars Ph 12	2014	Petropars		NGL				2014	110				
Nigeria	Bonga NW	2014	Shell		Crude	Light	0.600			40	1998/2001			
Nigeria	Escravos Gas to Liquids Plant	2014	Chevron		NGL					33				
Nigeria	Etim/Asasa Pressure Maintenance	2014	ExxonMobil		Crude					50				
Qatar	Pearl GTL Phase II	2014	Shell		Products	Diesel				70				
Qatar	Pearl NGL Phase II	2014	Shell		NGL					60				
Saudi Arabia	Shaybah Ph 3	2014	Saudi Aramco	LAND	Crude	Extra Light				0			No FID 250 kbd	
UAE	North East Bab EOR	2014	ADNOC	LAND	Crude					120				
Non-OPEC
Australia	Balnaves Development Project	2014	Apache Energy/KUFPAC	ODW	Crude					30				
Australia	Coniston Oil Field Project	2014	Apache Energy/Inpex	ODW	Crude					22			Expansion	
Australia	Ichthys	2014	Inpex	ODW	NGL		0.527			100	2000		FEED/No FID	
Brazil	Marlim Sul Module 4	2014	Petrobras	ODW		heavy				0			No FID 100 kbd	
Brazil	Iara	2014	Petrobras	ODW						100				
Brazil	Sapinhoa Norte	09/2014	Petrobras	ODW	Crude					150			Previously called Guara	
Brazil	Cernambi Sul	10/2014	Petrobras	ODW	Crude	32 API	1.8			150			Previously called Iracema	
Canada	AOSP Jackpine Mine (Ph 1B)	2014	Albian Sands	LAND	Bitumen	TAR				100				
Canada	Jackpine Mine (Ph 2)	2014	Albian Sands	LAND	Bitumen	Oil Sands				0			No FID 100 kbd	
Canada	Fort Hills Mine (Ph 3-4)	2014	Petro-Canada/UTS /Teck Cominco	LAND	Bitumen	Oil Sands				0		90 kbd suspended	Mining/Upgrading/Approved	
Canada	Joslyn Ph 1 (Deer Creek)	2014	Total		Bitumen					50				
Canada	Long Lake Upgrader Ph 2	2014	OPTI /Nexen	LAND	Bitumen	Oil Sands				60			Mining/Upgrading/Approved	
Canada	Sunrise Ph 2	2014	Husky Energy		Oil sands	Bitumen	1.0-2.2			0			SAGD No FID	
Kazakhstan	Karachaganak Phase III	2014	BG/Eni	LAND	Crude				2015	120	1979		No FID	
Mexico	(Chicontepec) Exp 2	2014	Pemex	LAND		Heavy	2.287		2020	200				
Russia	Vladimir Filanovsky	2014	Lukoil	LAND						120				
United States	Alaska Gas (Point Thomson)	2014	ExxonMobil	LAND	Condensate		0.2			10				
United States	Puma	2014	BP	ODW	Crude		0.2			40				
United States	Tubular Bells	2014	BP	ODW	Crude		0.2			40				
United States	Jack	2014	Chevron	ODW	Crude		0.2			170				
