= Oil megaprojects (2010) =

Following is a list of Oil megaprojects in the year 2010, projects that propose to bring more than 20,000 barrels per day (3,200 m^{3}/d) of new liquid fuel capacity to market with the first production of fuel. This is part of the Wikipedia summary of Oil Megaprojects.

== Quick links to other years ==
Overview	2003	2004	2005	2006	2007	2008	2009	2010	2011	2012	2013	2014	2015	2016	2017	2018	2019	2020

== Detailed list of projects for 2010 ==
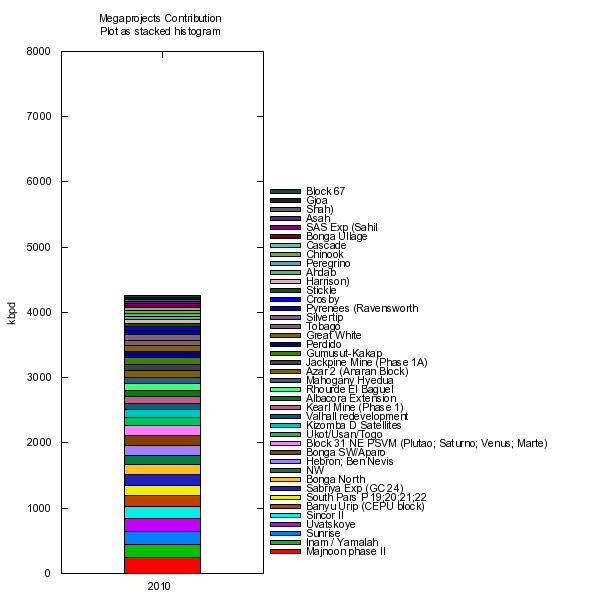
2010 gross new supply addition (updated 29 December 2007)

Terminology

- Year Startup: year of first oil. put specific date if available.
- Operator: company undertaking the project.
- Area: onshore (LAND), offshore (OFF), offshore deep water (ODW), tar sands (TAR).
- Type: liquid category (i.e. Natural Gas Liquids, Natural gas condensate, Crude oil)
- Grade: oil quality (light, medium, heavy, sour) or API gravity
- 2P resvs: 2P (proven + probable) oil reserves in giga barrels (Gb).
- GOR: The ratio of produced gas to produced oil, commonly abbreviated GOR.
- Peak year: year of the production plateau/peak.
- Peak: maximum production expected (thousand barrels/day).
- Discovery: year of discovery.
- Capital investment: expected capital cost; FID (Final Investment Decision) - If no FID, then normally no project development contracts can be awarded. For many projects, a FEED stage (Front End Engineering Design) precedes the FID.
- Notes: comments about the project (footnotes).
- Ref: list of sources.

Country	Project name	Year startup	Operator	Area	Type	Grade	2P resvs	GOR	Peak Year	Peak	Discovery	Capital Inv.	Notes	Ref
OPEC
Algeria	Rhourde El Baguel Exp	2010	BP		Crude	40 API	0.7		2011	50	1962			
Iran	Azar 2 (Anaran Block)	2010	Statoil		Crude		0.5			55	2005			
Iran	Mehr	2010	OMV	LAND	Crude	22 API	0.3		2012	40	2005			
Iraq	Rafidain	2010	SOC	LAND	Crude		0.9		2011	0			No FID, 100 kbd	
Iraq	Subba; Luhais Ph 1	2010	Petrel		Crude	27-32 API	1.900		2011	0			SC delays, 150 kbd	
Iraq	Taq Taq ph 2	2010	Addax/Genel Enerji	LAND	Crude	46 API	1.2		2010	90				
Iraq	Rumaila	2010	RFOO	LAND	Crude				2016	1850	1953	$US 15B	Rehabilitation and expansion project	Rumaila
Nigeria	Ebok	4/2010	Afren		Crude					35				
Nigeria	Gbaran Ubie Ph 1	6/2010	Shell		Crude					70				
Qatar	Al Shaheen Expansion	2010	TotalEnergies		Crude	30 API	2.5		2009	80				
Qatar	RasGas 2 Train 7	2010	Exxon		NGL					75				
Qatar	Qatargas 3 Train 6	2010	QP/Conoco Phillips/Mitsui		NGL					75				
Saudi Arabia	Khurais Exp Ph 2	1/2010	Saudi Aramco		Crude	33 API	8.500			600	1957			
Saudi Arabia	Khurais Exp	1/2010	Saudi Aramco		NGL					70	1957			
UAE	Jarn Yabhour; Ramhan	2010	Occidental		Crude				2012	20				
UAE	Lower Zakum - Umm Shaif Exp	2010	ADNOC	LAND	Crude	39 API			2012	150	1963			
Non-OPEC
Australia	Pyrenees (Ravensworth, Crosby, Stickle, Harrison)	3/2010	BHP Billiton	OFF	Crude		0.08-0.12		2010	50				
Australia	Van Gogh	1/2010	Apache	OFF	Crude		0.05		6/2009	15				
Brazil	Cachalote Ph 1 (Baleia Franca)	3/2010	Petrobras	ODW	Crude	19-23 API	0.35			75				
Brazil	Frade Ph 2	2010	Chevron	ODW	Crude	18 API	0.25		2011	60	1986			
Brazil	Tupi Pilot	10/2010	Petrobras	ODW	Crude	Light			2011	85	2007			
Brazil	BS-500 (Urugua; Tambau)	3/2010	Petrobras	ODW	Crude	Light				30				
Canada	North Amethyst	1/2010	Husky	OFF	Crude	34 API	0.070		2011	35				
Canada	AOSP Expansion 1 (Jackpine Ph 1A)	2010	Shell		Bitumen					90				
Canada	Christina Lake (Phase 1C)	2010	EnCana	LAND	Bitumen	Tar Sands				30				
Canada	Algar	2010	Connacher	LAND	Bitumen	Tar Sands				10				
Canada	Firebag Ph 4	2010	Suncor	LAND	BIT				2010	60				
Denmark	Halfdan Ph 4	2010	Maersk Oil		Crude	Light				20				
Gabon	East Orovinyare (EOV)	5/2010	BowLeven	OFF	Crude		0.015		2010	10				
Ghana	Jubilee (Mahogany; Hyedua)	10/2010	Tullow/Kosmos	ODW	Crude	37 API	0.500		2012	120		$US 4B		
India	B-193 Cluster	5/2010	ONGC	OFF	Crude		0.045			25				
Norway	Gjøa	8/2010	Statoil		Crude		0.082			50				
Norway	Morvin	5/2010	Statoil	OFF	Crude		0.053		2011	20				
Norway	Valemon	2010	Statoil		NGL		0.040			30				
Norway	Valhall redevelopment	9/2010	BP		Crude		0.3			90	1969			
Norway	Yme	2010	Talisman	OFF	Crude		0.050		2010	25				
Oman	Harweel EOR	2010	PDO		Crude				2010	45				
Oman	Mukhaizna EOR Ph 2	2010	Occidental		Crude	16 API	1		2011	65				
Oman	Qarn Alam EOR	2010	PDO		Crude				2010	45				
Philippines	Malampaya	2010	Burgundy Global		Crude		0.030			15				
Russia	Bolshekhetsky (Suzunskoye; Tagulskoye)	2010	TNK-BP	LAND	Crude				2014	100				
Russia	South Priobskoye Exp	2010	Gazprom	LAND	Crude		1.6		2011	150				
United States	Chinook, Cascade	7/2010	Petrobras	ODW	Crude					80				
United States	Clipper	7/2010	ATP Oil and Gas	ODW	Crude					10				
United States	Perdido Hub (Great White; Tobago; Silvertip)	3/2010	Shell	ODW	Crude		0.45			100	2002			
United States	Phoenix	7/2010	Helix	OFF	Crude					25				
United States	Telemark Hub (Mirage; Morgus; Telemark)	1/2010	ATP Oil and Gas	ODW	Crude		0.032			15				
Vietnam	Nam Rong Doi Moi	2010	VRJ Petroleum	OFF	Crude	Heavy				15		No FID		
Vietnam	Te Giac Trang	2010	Hoang Long Joint				0.3		2010	55				
Vietnam	Su Tu Den (Black Lion) Northeast	2010	Cuu Long Joint				0.200			40	2002			
