= Oil megaprojects (2015) =

This page summarizes projects that propose to bring more than 20,000 barrels per day (3,200 m^{3}/d) of new liquid fuel capacity to market with the first production of fuel beginning in 2015. This is part of the Wikipedia summary of Oil Megaprojects.

== Quick links to other years ==
Overview	2003	2004	2005	2006	2007	2008	2009	2010	2011	2012	2013	2014	2015	2016	2017	2018	2019	2020

== Detailed list of projects for 2015 ==
Terminology

- Year Startup: year of first oil. put specific date if available.
- Operator: company undertaking the project.
- Area: onshore (LAND), offshore (OFF), offshore deep water (ODW), tar sands (TAR).
- Type: liquid category (i.e. Natural Gas Liquids, Natural gas condensate, Crude oil)
- Grade: oil quality (light, medium, heavy, sour) or API gravity
- 2P resvs: 2P (proven + probable) oil reserves in giga barrels (Gb).
- GOR: The ratio of produced gas to produced oil, commonly abbreviated GOR.
- Peak year: year of the production plateau/peak.
- Peak: maximum production expected (thousand barrels/day).
- Discovery: year of discovery.
- Capital investment: expected capital cost; FID (Final Investment Decision) - If no FID, then normally no project development contracts can be awarded. For many projects, a FEED stage (Front End Engineering Design) precedes the FID.
- Notes: comments about the project (footnotes).
- Ref: list of sources.

Country	Project name	Year startup	Operator	Area	Type	Grade	2P resvs	GOR	Peak Year	Peak	Discovery	Capital Inv.	Notes	Ref
OPEC
Angola	Lianzi field	2015	Chevron	ODW	Crude					46				
Angola	Mafumeira Sul	2015	Chevron	ODW	Crude					120				
Iran	Darkhovin Ph 3	2015	Eni	LAND	Crude					120				
Iran	South Pars Ph 15-16	2015	POGC, ISOICO		Condensate NGL	Light			2016	80				
Nigeria	Forcados Yokri IP	2015	Shell		Crude	Light	0.600			90				
Nigeria	Zabazaba-Etan	2015	Eni		Crude					120				
UAE	Upper Zakum Exp	2015	ADNOC		Crude	Light			2017	200	1963		No FID	
Saudi Arabia	Manifa Ph 1	2015	Saudi Aramco	OFF	Crude	28 API	16.820			300	1957			
Saudi Arabia	Manifa NGL	2015	Saudi Aramco	OFF	NGL					65	1957			
Venezuela	Orinoco Carabobo II	2015	PDVSA		Crude	7-10 API	5.7		2017	200			no FID	
Non-OPEC
Azerbaijan	Inam / Yamalah	2015	Socar BP		Crude		2.000			200				
Brazil	Cachalote Ph 2 (Baleia Franca; Baleia Ana)	2015	Petrobras	ODW		19-30 API				100				
Brazil	Tupi oil field	2015	Petrobras	Santos BM-S-11		28	5		2016	200	2007		No FID	
Canada	Birch Mountain (Phase 2)	2015	CNRL	LAND	Bitumen	Oil sands				30			In-Situ, Announced	
Canada	Borealis Ph 1	2015	EnCana	LAND	Bitumen	Oil sands				35			In-Situ, Application	
Canada	Horizon Mine & Upgrader (Phase 4)	2015	CNRL	LAND	Bitumen	Oil sands				145			Mining&Upgrading, Announced	
Canada	Surmont Ph 2	2015	ConocoPhillips		Oil sands	Bitumen				130				
East Timor	Greater Sunrise	2015	Woodside		NGL		0.300			25		No FID		
Russia	Shtokman	2015	Gazprom	OFF	NGL		0.200		2020	15				
South Africa	Mafutha CTL	2015	Sasol		CTL					80		No FID		
UK	Rosebank/Lochnagar	2015	Chevron	OFF	Crude		0.450		2015	75	2004		No FID	
UK	Western Isles	2015	Dana Petroleum	OFF	Crude					40			No FID	
United States	Jack; St Malo	2015	Chevron	ODW	Crude		1-15			200+		No FID		
United States	Kaskida	2015	BP	ODW	Crude					0		No FID 140 kbd		
