= Oil megaprojects (2013) =

This page summarizes projects that propose to bring more than 20,000 barrels per day (3,200 m^{3}/d) of new liquid fuel capacity to market, with the first production of fuel beginning in 2013. This is part of the Wikipedia summary of oil megaprojects.

== Quick links to other years ==
Overview	2003	2004	2005	2006	2007	2008	2009	2010	2011	2012	2013	2014	2015	2016	2017	2018	2019	2020

== Detailed list of projects for 2013 ==
Terminology

- Year startup: year of first oil; specific date if available
- Operator: company undertaking the project
- Area: onshore (LAND), offshore (OFF), offshore deep water (ODW), tar sands (TAR)
- Type: liquid category (i.e. natural gas liquids, natural gas condensate, crude oil)
- Grade: oil quality (light, medium, heavy, sour) or API gravity
- 2P resvs: 2P (proven + probable) oil reserves in giga barrels (Gb)
- GOR: ratio of produced gas to produced oil, commonly abbreviated GOR
- Peak year: year of the production plateau/peak
- Peak: maximum production expected (thousand barrels/day)
- Discovery: year of discovery
- Capital investment: expected capital cost; FID (Final Investment Decision); if no FID, then normally no project development contracts can be awarded. For many projects, a FEED stage (Front End Engineering Design) precedes the FID.
- Notes: comments about the project (footnotes)
- Ref.: sources

Country	Project name	Year startup	Operator	Area	Type	Grade	2P resvs	GOR	Peak year	Peak	Discovery	Capital inv.	Notes	Ref.
OPEC
Algeria	El Merk	2013	Anadarko/Sonatrach	ON	Crude					100				
Angola	Block 31 SE PAJ (Palas; Astraea; Juno; Urano; Ceres; Hebe; Titania)	2013	BP	ODW	Crude					110	2005			
Iran	Resalat Exp	2013	Amona	OFF	Crude					35				
Iraq	Nahr Omar; Bin Omar Ph 1	2013	INOC				6.0			200	1949		No FID, maybe 450 kbd	
Kuwait	Neutral Zone Exp	2013	KGOC	OFF	Crude	Heavy				30				
Kuwait	Sabriyah Exp (GC 24)	2013	KOC		Crude		4.3		2015	160	1957			
Nigeria	Olero Creek Restoration Project	2013	Chevron	Land	Crude					48				
Saudi Arabia	Neutral Zone Exp	2013	KGOC	OFF	Crude	Heavy				30				
Non-OPEC
Australia	Montara/Skua oilfield	2013	PTTEP	ODW	Crude					35				
Azerbaijan	ACG Chirag Exp	2013	BP							100				
Brazil	Sapinhoá	01/2013	Petrobras	ODW	Crude	30				120			Previously called Guara South. Full production planned for mid-2014.	
Brazil	Roncador Module 3 (P55)	7/2013	Petrobras	ODW		22 API			2014	180				
Brazil	Roncador Module 4 (P62)	2013	Petrobras	ODW		18 API				100			No FID, 100 kbd	
Brazil	Papa Terra P61 P63	7/2013	Petrobras	ODW		15 API	0.7			150	2003			
Brazil	Waikiki	2013	OGX	OFF	Crude					20	2010			
Canada	Birch Mountain (Phase 1)	2013	CNRL	LAND	Bitumen	Tar Sands			2014	30			In situ, announced	
Canada	Horizon Oil Sands Project Ph 2, 3	2013	CNR	LAND	Bitumen	Tar Sands				0		Delayed, 118 kbd	Mining & upgrading	
Canada	Christina Lake (Unnamed Expansion 3)	2013	EnCana	LAND	Bitumen	Tar Sands				30			In situ, announced	
Canada	Sunrise Ph 1	1/2013	Husky Energy		Tar sands	Bitumen	1.0-2.2			0		50 kbd suspended	SAGD	
China	Ningxia Hui CTL	2013	Sasol Shenhua JV	LAND	CTL					0		80 kbd	No FID	
Kazakhstan	Karachaganak Phase III	2013	BG/Eni	LAND	Crude				2014	0	1979		70 kbd suspended	
Kazakhstan	Kashagan Phase I	2013	Eni	OFF	Crude	45 API	13			300	2000			
Kazakhstan	Tengiz Expansion	2013	Chevron	LAND	Crude		3.3			260	1979			
Malaysia	Kebabangan	2013	Petronas		Crude		0.15		2014	40				
Norway	Froy	2013	DNO	ODW	Crude		0.056			25				
Norway	Goliat	2013	Eni	ODW	Crude					80				
Papua New Guinea	PNG LNG	2013	ExxonMobil Syntroleum	LAND	NGL GTL					40			No FID	
Russia	Kuyumbin	2013	Slavneft	LAND	Crude					60				
South Africa	Secunda CTL Exp	2013	Sasol	LAND	Products	Diesel			2015	30				
UK	Kessog	2013	BP	OFF	Crude					25				
UK	Huntington	2013	E.ON	OFF	Crude					30				
Vietnam	Hai Su Trang/Den	2013	Talisman	OFF	Crude		0.06			25				
