= Pazflor oil development =

Oil field in Angola

Pazflor oil fields: Perpetua, Hortensia, Zinia, Acacia
- Country: Angola
- Block: 17
- Offshore/onshore: Offshore
- Operators: TotalEnergies
- Partners: TotalEnergies; Equinor; ExxonMobil; BP

Field history
- Discovery: 2000–2003
- Start of production: 2011

Production
- Recoverable oil: 590 million barrels (~8.0×10^{7} t)
- Producing formations: Upper Miocene; Oligocene

The Pazflor oil development is an offshore oil development in Angola. It involves Perpetua, Hortensia and Zinia (Upper Miocene), and Acacia (Oligocene) oilfields, which were discovered between mid-2000 and early 2003.

== Location ==
The Pazflor oil development located in center of Block 17 about 150 kilometres (93 mi) off the coast of Angola and 40 kilometres (25 mi) north-east of Dalia oilfield in depths of 600 to 1,200 metres (2,000 to 3,900 ft). It covers 600 square kilometres (230 sq mi) with a north-south axis of over 30 kilometres (19 mi).

== Technical features ==
The Pazflor oil development will produce heavy crude oil from Miocene reservoirs, and lighter oil from the Acacia Oligocene reservoir. Drilling operations were commenced in 2009 and oil production started on 24 August 2011. The processing capacity of 200,000 barrels per day (32,000 m^{3}/d) of oil will be ensured with 49 wells. The Pazflor FPSO was constructed in Okpo, Geoje, South Korea for Daewoo Shipbuilding & Marine Engineering and on the 18 January 2011 it started the 10,000-nautical-mile (19,000 km; 12,000 mi) journey to Angola where it was moored and installed. It was towed by three Fairmount Marine's tugs.

== Operator ==
Sonangol is the Block 17 concessionaire. Like other developments in the Block 17, the operator is TotalEnergies with interest of 40%, and other partners are Equinor (23.33%), ExxonMobil (20%) and BP (16.67%).
