= Oil megaprojects (2009) =

This page summarizes projects that propose to bring more than 20,000 barrels per day (3,200 m^{3}/d) of new liquid fuel capacity to market with the first production of fuel beginning in 2009. This is part of the Wikipedia summary of oil megaprojects.

== Quick links to other years ==
Overview	2003	2004	2005	2006	2007	2008	2009	2010	2011	2012	2013	2014	2015	2016	2017	2018	2019	2020

== Detailed project table for 2009 ==
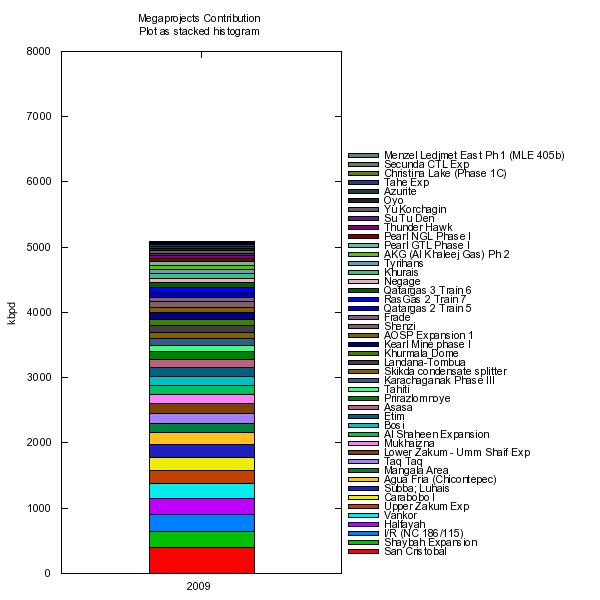
2009 gross new supply addition (updated 29/12/2007)

Terminology

- Year startup: year of first oil, specific date if available
- Operator: company undertaking the project
- Area: onshore (LAND), offshore (OFF), offshore deep water (ODW), tar sands (TAR)
- Type: liquid category (i.e. natural gas liquids, natural gas condensate, crude oil)
- Grade: oil quality (light, medium, heavy, sour) or API gravity
- 2P resvs: 2P (proven + probable) oil reserves in giga barrels (Gb)
- GOR: the ratio of produced gas to produced oil, commonly abbreviated GOR
- Peak year: year of the production plateau/peak
- Peak: maximum production expected (thousand barrels/day)
- Discovery: year of discovery
- Capital investment: expected capital cost; FID (Final Investment Decision). If no FID, then normally no project development contracts can be awarded. For many projects, a FEED stage (Front End Engineering Design) precedes the FID.
- Notes: comments and sources

Country	Project name	Year startup	Operator	Area	Type	Grade	2P resvs	GOR	Peak Year	Peak	Discovery	Capital Inv.	Notes
OPEC
Algeria	Skikda condensate	2009	CNPC		Condensate					0		No field ref, 100 kbd	
Angola	Block 0 (Area A Mafumeira Norte)	7/2009	Chevron	OFF	Crude				2011	30			
Angola	Block 14 (Tombua; Landana)	9/2009	Chevron	OFF	Crude		0.340		2011	100	1997–2001		
Angola	Block 4 Gimboa	4/2009	Sonangol	OFF	Crude	26 API	0.050		2009	40			
Iran	South Pars Oil Layer Ph 1	7/2009	NIOC (PEDCO)	OFF	Crude	Medium				35			
Iran	South Pars phase 6-7-8	2009	Statoil	OFF	Condensate NGL				2009	180			
Iraq	Hamrin	2009	SOC	LAND	Crude	32 API				0	1961	No FID, 60 kbd	
Iraq	Nassiriya Ph 1	6/2009	INOC		Crude	26-38 API	2.60		2010	50		Maybe 300 kbd	
Iraq	Taq Taq ph 1	5/2009	Addax/Genel Enerji	LAND	Crude	46 API	1.2		2009	60			
Kuwait	Sabriya; Umm Niqa Ph 1	6/2009	KPC	LAND	NGL				2009	50			
Nigeria	Abo Ph 2	8/2009	Eni	OFF	Crude		0.040			15			
Nigeria	Akpo	3/2009	Total	ODW	Condensate	Light	0.620			175	2000		
Nigeria	Oyo	11/2009	Eni	OFF	Crude	35 API	0.060			25			
Qatar	Qatargas 2 Train 4	6/2009	QP	LAND	NGL					80			
Qatar	Ras Laffan Condensate Refinery Ph 1	2/2009	QP		Condensate	Light				140			
Qatar	AKG (Al Khaleej Gas) Ph 2	6/2009	Exxon		NGL					70			
Qatar	Qatargas 2 Train 5	11/2009	QP		NGL					80			
Qatar	RasGas 2 Train 6	6/2009	Exxon		NGL					75			
Saudi Arabia	AFK Ph 2 (Abu Hadriya; Fadhili; Khursaniyah)	1/2009	Saudi Aramco	LAND	Crude	Light			2009	200	1956		
Saudi Arabia	Khurais Exp Ph 1	6/2009	Saudi Aramco		Crude	33 API	8.500			600	1957		
Saudi Arabia	Khursaniyah Gas	11/2009	Saudi Aramco	LAND	NGL	NGL			2010	280	1956		
Saudi Arabia	Nuayyim Exp	5/2009	Saudi Aramco	LAND	Crude	Super Light			2009	100	1990		
Saudi Arabia	Shaybah Ph 2	6/2009	Saudi Aramco	LAND	Crude	Extra Light				250			
UAE	OGD 3; AGD 2 (Onshore and Asab Gas Development)	8/2009	ADNOC		NGL					135			
Venezuela	San Cristobal Exp	9/2009	PDVSA		Crude	18 API	1.7		2012	0		no FID, 75 kbd	
Non-OPEC
Australia	Montara; Skua; Swift; Swallow	10/2009	PTTEP	OFF	Crude	Light	0.039		2009	20			
Brazil	Camarupim; Bia (FPSO Cidade de Sao Mateus)	2/2009	Petrobras	OFF	Crude				2009	35			
Brazil	Frade Ph 1	6/2009	Chevron	ODW	Crude	18 API	0.25		2009	20	1986		
Brazil	Marlim Leste-Jabuti (FPSO Cidade de Niteroi)	3/2009	Petrobras	ODW	Crude	19-20 API			2009	100	1987		
Brazil	Marlim Sul Mod 2 P-51	1/2009	Petrobras	ODW		25 API				180	1987		
Brazil	Parque das Conchas (BC10 - Ostra; Abalone; Nautilus; Argonauta)	7/2009	Shell	ODW						100			
Brazil	Pinauna	10/2009	El Paso Natural Gas	OFF	Crude	32 API	0.035		2010	15			
Brazil	Tupi EPT	5/2009	Petrobras	ODW	Crude	Light			2009	15	2007		
Canada	Firebag Ph 3	2009	Suncor	LAND	BIT				2010	60			
Canada	Primrose East	2/2009	Canadian Natural Resources	LAND	BIT				2010	40			
China	Bozhong	3/2009	CNOOC	OFF	Crude				2011	25			
China	Jidong Nanpu	2009	CNOOC	OFF	Crude		0.635		2009	200			
China	Peng Lai Phase II	7/2009	ConocoPhillips	OFF	Crude		0.850		2011	70	1999		
Congo	Azurite	6/2009	Murphy Oil	ODW	Crude		0.075		2009	30	2005		
Congo	M'Boundi Exp	2009	Eni	OFF	Crude					30			
Gabon	Olowi	4/2009	Canadian Natural Resources	OFF	Crude	34 API	0.030		2009	20			
India	Mangala Area (Mangala; Bhagyam; Aishwariya)	9/2009	Cairn Energy	LAND	Petroleum		1.2		2012	175			
Indonesia	Banyu Urip (CEPU block) Ph 1	1/2009	ExxonMobil	LAND	Crude	heavy sour	0.600			25	2001		
Malaysia	D1 Cluster (D-30; D-30 West; D-41; D-41 West)	7/2009	Petronas	OFF			0.03		2010	15			
Malaysia	Northern Fields PM-3 (Bunga Orkid; Pakma)	3/2009	Talisman	OCS			0.068		2012	30			
New Zealand	Maari	3/2009	OMV	OFF	Crude		0.056		2009	25			
Norway	Tyrihans	7/2009	Statoil	OFF	Crude		0.182			70	1984		
Russia	Sakhalin-II Phase 2 (Piltun-Astokhskoye (PA field))	1/2009	Gazprom Shell	OFF			1.00		2009	100			
Russia	Uvat Group Ph 1	2/2009	TNK-BP	LAND	Crude		0.75		2010	40			
Russia	Vankor Field	8/2009	Rosneft	LAND	Crude		3.8		2011	315	1988		
Russia	Yuri Korchagin	8/2009	Lukoil	OFF	Crude		0.200		2012	40	2000		
Russia	Yuzhno-Khylchuyuskoye "YK" Ph 2	1/2009	Lukoil ConocoPhillips	LAND	Petroleum	35.3 API	0.5		2009	75			
Sudan	Qamari	3/2009		LAND	Crude				2010	50			
Thailand	Na Sanun East Exp	2009	Pan Orient	LAND	Crude	36 API			2009	12	2006	No FID	
UK	Don W SW	7/2009	Petrofac	OFF	Crude	34 API	0.055		2009	25	1975		
UK	Ettrick	8/2009	Nexen	OFF	Crude		0.039		2009	15			
US	Marlin Exp	5/2009	BP	ODW	Crude					25			
US	Shenzi	3/2009	BHP Billiton	ODW	Crude		0.370			100	2002		
US	Tahiti	5/2009	Chevron	ODW	Crude		0.450		2009	125	2002		
US	Thunder Hawk	7/2009	Murphy Oil	ODW			0.07		2010	35	2004		
Yemen	East Shabwa Exp	2009	Total	LAND	Crude					30			
