= Oil megaprojects (2006) =

This page summarizes projects that brought more than 20,000 barrels per day (3,200 m^{3}/d) of new liquid fuel capacity to market with the first production of fuel beginning in 2006. This is part of the Wikipedia summary of Oil Megaprojects. 2006 saw 30 projects come on stream with an aggregate capacity of 4.092 million barrels per day (650,600 m^{3}/d) when full production was reached this list does not like include any of the enormous project developed in the United States which dwarf these by +-5000 BOE (which may not have been in 2006).

== Quick links to other years ==
Overview	2003	2004	2005	2006	2007	2008	2009	2010	2011	2012	2013	2014	2015	2016	2017	2018	2019	2020

== Detailed project table for 2006 ==
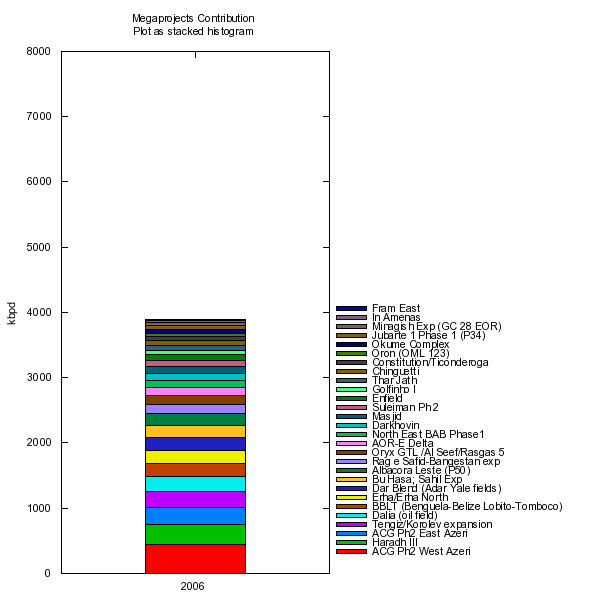
2006 gross new supply addition (updated 09/12/2007)

Terminology

- Year startup: year of first oil. Specific date if available.
- Operator: company undertaking the project.
- Area: onshore (LAND), offshore (OFF), offshore deep water (ODW), tar sands (TAR).
- Type: liquid category (i.e. Natural Gas Liquids, Natural gas condensate, Crude oil)
- Grade: oil quality (light, medium, heavy, sour) or API gravity
- 2P resvs: 2P (proven + probable) oil reserves in giga barrels (Gb).
- GOR: The ratio of produced gas to produced oil, commonly abbreviated GOR.
- Peak year: year of the production plateau/peak.
- Peak: maximum production expected (thousand barrels/day).
- Discovery: year of discovery.
- Capital investment: expected capital cost; FID (Final Investment Decision) - If no FID, then normally no project development contracts can be awarded. For many projects, a FEED stage (Front End Engineering Design) precedes the FID.
- Notes: comments about the project (footnotes).
- Ref.: list of sources.

Country	Project name	Year startup	Operator	Area	Type	Grade	2P resvs	GOR	Peak year	Peak	Discovery	Capital inv.	Notes	Ref.
OPEC
Algeria	In Amenas	6/2006	BP/Statoil	LAND	Condensate				2007	50				
Indonesia	West Seno Ph2 Exp	2006	Chevron	ODW	Crude				2007	20	1998			
Iran	Rag e Safid-Bangestan exp	2006	Qeshm		Crude	Light	2.400			150				
Kuwait	Minagish Exp (GC 28 EOR)	2006	KOC	LAND	Crude		3.3			60				
Nigeria	AOR-E Delta	2006	ExxonMobil				0.560			120				
Nigeria	Erha/Erha North	4/2006	ExxonMobil	ODW			0.500			200				
Nigeria	Oron (OML 123)	5/2006	Addax				0.142		2008	70				
Qatar	Oryx GTL /Al Seef/Rasgas 5	2006	Sasol/QatarEnergy/ExxonMobil		NGL/GTL				2008	130				
Saudi Arabia	Haradh III	3/2006	Saudi Aramco		Crude	Light (API 32)	3-7			300	1951			
UAE	Bu Hasa; Sahil Exp	2006	ADNOC							180				
UAE	North East BAB Phase1	2006	ADCO	Land + Shallow Marine						110				
Non-OPEC
Angola	Block 14 BBLT (Benguela-Belize Lobito-Tomboco)	6/2006	Chevron	OFF	Crude		0.400		2007	200				
Angola	Block 17 Dalia (oil field)	12/2006	Total				0.940			225	2007			
Australia	Enfield	7/2006	Woodside				0.127		2006	100		$1,321m	Max production reached 70kbbl/d, declined to 43kbbl/d by year end.	
Azerbaijan	ACG Ph2 West Azeri	1/2006	BP				2.3		2010	450				
Azerbaijan	ACG Ph2 East Azeri	10/2006	BP				5.8		2008	260				
Azerbaijan	Shah Deniz (Stage 1)	12/2006	BP	OFF	Condensate		0.800			40				
Brazil	Albacora Leste (P50)	4/21/2006	Petrobras		Crude	Heavy	0.534		2007	180				
Brazil	Golfinho I	5/6/2006	Petrobras		Crude	Light	0.450		2007	100				
Brazil	Jubarte 1 Phase 1 (P34)	12/17/2006	Petrobras		Crude	Heavy	0.600		2007	60				
Eq. Guinea	Okume Complex	12/2006	Hess						2008	60				
Kazakhstan	Tengiz/Korolev expansion	2006	Chevron	LAND	Crude		6.0			250				
Mauritania	Chinguetti	2007	Petronas				0.120		2006	75	2001–2003	$625m	Max production 75kbbl/d declined to 22kbbl/d by year end.	
Norway	Fram East	10/2006	Norsk Hydro	OFF			0.061			45		$1,000m		
Sudan	Dar Blend (Adar Yale oilfield)	7/2006	Petrodar		Crude	API 26	0.276		2007	200				
Sudan	Thar Jath	6/2006	Petronas	LAND	Crude		0.250			85				
United States	Constitution/Ticonderoga	2/2006	Anadarko Petroleum							70				
United States	Nanuq; Fiord (Alpine satellites)	9/2006	Conoco Phillips	LAND	Crude		0.1		2008	25				
Yemen	Malik	2006	Calvalley	LAND	Crude				2009	30				

=== Terminology ===
- Year startup: year of first oil. Specific date if available.
- Operator: company undertaking the project.
- Area: onshore (LAND), offshore (OFF), offshore deep water (ODW), tar sands (TAR).
- Type: liquid category (i.e. Natural Gas Liquids, Natural gas condensate, Crude oil)
- Grade: oil quality (light, medium, heavy, sour) or API gravity
- 2P resvs: 2P (proven + probable) oil reserves in giga barrels (Gb).
- GOR: The ratio of produced gas to produced oil, commonly abbreviated GOR.
- Peak year: year of the production plateau/peak.
- Peak: maximum production expected (thousand barrels/day).
- Discovery: year of discovery.
- Capital investment: expected capital cost; FID (Final Investment Decision) - If no FID, then normally no project development contracts can be awarded. For many projects, a FEED stage (Front End Engineering Design) precedes the FID.
- Notes: comments about the project (footnotes).
- Ref.: list of sources.
