= Oil megaprojects (2012) =

This page summarizes projects that propose to bring more than 20,000 barrels per day (3,200 m^{3}/d) of new liquid fuel capacity to market, with the first production of fuel beginning in 2012. This is part of the Wikipedia summary of oil megaprojects.

== Quick links to other years ==
Overview	2003	2004	2005	2006	2007	2008	2009	2010	2011	2012	2013	2014	2015	2016	2017	2018	2019	2020

== Detailed list of projects for 2012 ==
Terminology

- Year startup: year of first oil; specific date if available
- Operator: company undertaking the project
- Area: onshore (LAND), offshore (OFF), offshore deep water (ODW), tar sands (TAR)
- Type: liquid category (i.e. natural gas liquids, natural gas condensate, crude oil)
- Grade: oil quality (light, medium, heavy, sour) or API gravity
- 2P resvs: 2P (proven + probable) oil reserves in giga barrels (Gb)
- GOR: ratio of produced gas to produced oil, commonly abbreviated GOR
- Peak year: year of the production plateau/peak
- Peak: maximum production expected (thousand barrels/day)
- Discovery: year of discovery
- Capital investment: expected capital cost; FID (Final Investment Decision); if no FID, then normally no project development contracts can be awarded. For many projects, a FEED stage (Front End Engineering Design) precedes the FID.
- Notes: comments about the project (footnotes)
- Ref.: sources

Country	Project name	Year startup	Operator	Area	Type	Grade	2P resvs	GOR	Peak year	Peak	Discovery	Capital inv.	Notes	Ref.
OPEC
Algeria	Block 405b CAFC	2012	Eni		NGL					20				
Angola	Block 15 Kizomba Ph 1 (Clochas; Mavacola)	2012	ExxonMobil	ODW	Crude					100	2000			
Angola	Block 14 Negage	2012	Chevron	ODW	Crude					75	2002			
Angola	Block 18 West (Platina; Chumbo; Cesio)	2012	BP	ODW	Crude					100				
Angola	Block 31 NE PSVM (Plutao; Saturno; Venus; Marte)	2012	BP	ODW	Crude		0.6		2013	150	2002–2004			
Ecuador	Pungarayacu Ph 1	2012	Petroecuador		Crude	8 API	3			30				
Iran	Jufeyr 1	2012	INOC	LAND	Crude					25				
Iraq	Majnoon Exp 1	2012					7.000		2013	200	1977			
Iraq	Nassiriya Ph 2	2012	INOC		Crude	26-38 API	2.60			150			Maybe 300 kbd	
Kuwait	Sabriya; Umm Niqa Ph 2	6/2009	KPC	LAND	NGL				2012	50				
Libya	I/R (NC 186/115)	2012	Repsol	LAND	Crude		0.16		2012	30	2005			
Nigeria	Bosi, Etim, Asasa	2012	Exxon		Crude	Light				120	1996			
Nigeria	Erha North Ph 2	2012	ExxonMobil		Crude	Light				30			No FID	
Nigeria	H Block	2012	Shell		Crude	Light				100				
Nigeria	Nsiko	2012	Chevron		Crude	Light				100	2003			
UAE	SAS Exp (Sahil, Asah, Shah)	5/2012	ADCO	LAND	Crude					60				
Non-OPEC
Australia	Crux Liquids	5/2012	Nexus Energy	OFF	Condensate		0.075		2012	30				
Brazil	Baleia Azul	7/2012	Petrobras	ODW	Crude					100				
Canada	Hibernia South Exp	8/2012	HMDC	OFF	Crude	Crude			2013	80			No FID	
Canada	Jackfish Ph 2	2012	Devon Energy	LAND	Crude	Bitumen	0.7		2012	30				
Canada	Christina Lake (Unnamed Expansion 2)	2012	EnCana	LAND	Bitumen	Tar Sands				30			In situ, announced	
Canada	Kearl Mine Ph 1	2012	ExxonMobil	LAND	Bitumen					110				
China	Jidong Nanpu Ph 1 (Bohai Bay)	2012	PetroChina	OFF			3.0			200	2007			
Eq. Guinea	Doula	2012	Noble Energy		Crude	light	?			50				
Ghana	Tano Shallow	2012	Tullow	OFF	Crude		0.025			20		No FID		
Indonesia	Ranggas; Gehem; Gendalo	2012	Chevron		Crude	28 API	0.150			50	2001			
Malaysia	Gumusut-Kakap	2012	Shell	ODW	Crude		0.300		2012	155	2001			
Mexico	Ayin-Alux	2012	Pemex	OFF			0.173		2014	70				
Russia	Verkhnechonsk Ph 2	2012	TNK-BP Rosneft	LAND	Crude		1.480			150	1978			
UK	Cheviot	2012	Chevron	OFF	Crude					20				
United States	Caesar; Tonga	2012	Anadarko	ODW	Crude		0.2			50			No FID	
Vietnam	Su Tu Trang	2012	Cuu Long Joint	OFF		38-55 API	0.220			20	2003			
