= Oil megaprojects (2016) =

This page summarizes projects that propose to bring more than 20,000 barrels per day (3,200 m^{3}/d) of new liquid fuel capacity to market with the first production of fuel beginning in 2016. This is part of the Wikipedia summary of Oil Megaprojects.

== Quick links to other years ==
Overview	2003	2004	2005	2006	2007	2008	2009	2010	2011	2012	2013	2014	2015	2016	2017	2018	2019	2020

== Detailed list of projects for 2016 ==
Terminology

- Year Startup: year of first oil. put specific date if available.
- Operator: company undertaking the project.
- Area: onshore (LAND), offshore (OFF), offshore deep water (ODW), tar sands (TAR).
- Type: liquid category (i.e. Natural Gas Liquids, Natural gas condensate, Crude oil)
- Grade: oil quality (light, medium, heavy, sour) or API gravity
- 2P resvs: 2P (proven + probable) oil reserves in giga barrels (Gb).
- GOR: The ratio of produced gas to produced oil, commonly abbreviated GOR.
- Peak year: year of the production plateau/peak.
- Peak: maximum production expected (thousand barrels/day).
- Discovery: year of discovery.
- Capital investment: expected capital cost; FID (Final Investment Decision) - If no FID, then normally no project development contracts can be awarded. For many projects, a FEED stage (Front End Engineering Design) precedes the FID.
- Notes: comments about the project (footnotes).
- Ref: list of sources.

Country	Project name	Year startup	Operator	Area	Type	Grade	2P resvs	GOR	Peak Year	Peak	Discovery	Capital Inv.	Notes	Ref
OPEC
Angola	Kizomba Satellites Phase II	2016	ExxonMobil	ODW	Crude					125				
Angola	Negage	2016	Chevron	ODW	Crude					75				
Angola	Lucapa	2016	Chevron	ODW	Crude					100				
Angola	East Hub project (Cabaca Norte, South-East)	2016	Eni	ODW	Crude					80				
Angola	B31 SE	2016	BP	ODW	Crude					200				
Iran	Azadegan Ph 1	2016	CNPC	Land	Crude					75				
Iran	South Pars Ph 11	2016	CNPC	Offshore	Crude					80				
Iran	South Pars Ph 17-18	2016	PetroPars, OIEC, IOEC	Offshore	Crude					80				
Iran	South Pars Ph 22-23-24	2016	Petro Sina Arian, Sadra	Offshore	Crude					77				
Iran	Yadavaran Ph 1	2016	Sinopec	LAND	Crude	Heavy	3.20			85	2000			
Nigeria	Bonga SW; Aparo	2016	Shell		Crude	Light	0.600			225	1998/2001			
Nigeria	Dibi Long-Term Project	2016	Chevron		Crude					70				
Nigeria	Sonam Field Development	2016	Chevron		Crude					30				
Nigeria	Bosi	2016	ExxonMobil		Crude					140				
Nigeria	Erha North Phase 2	2016	ExxonMobil		Crude					60				
Nigeria	Satellite Field Development Phase 2	2016	ExxonMobil		Crude					80				
Nigeria	Uge	2016	ExxonMobil		Crude					110				
Nigeria	Bongo North	2016	Shell		Crude					100				
Nigeria	Usan Future Phases	2016	Total		Crude					50				
Saudi Arabia	Manifa Ph 2	2016	Saudi Aramco	OFF	Crude	28 API	16.820			300	1957			
Non-OPEC
Canada	Hebron (Ben Nevis)	2016	ExxonMobil	OFF	Crude	Heavy	0.730			140	1981			
Canada	Sunrise Ph 3	2016	Husky Energy		Oil Sands	Bitumen	1.0-2.2			0		No FID, 50 kbd	SAGD	
Canada	NAOSC Strathcona Ph 1	2016	StatoilHydro	LAND	Bitumen	Oil Sands				65				
Canada	Gregoire Lake (Phase 1)	2016	CNRL	LAND	Bitumen	Oil Sands				30			In-Situ, Announced	
Canada	Joslyn Ph 2	2016	CNRL	LAND	Bitumen	Oil Sands				0			Application No FID 50 kbd	
Canada	Long Lake Upgrader Ph 3	2016	OPTI /Nexen	LAND	Bitumen	Oil Sands				0			Mining, Upgrading, No FID, 60 kbd	
Kazakhstan	Kashagan (Phase 2+, Satellites)	2016	ENI	OFF	Crude	45 API	7.8		2020	850	2000	$136B, No FID		
Malaysia	Malikai	2016	Shell	ODW	Crude					150	2004			
United Kingdom Falkland Islands	Sea Lion	2016	Rockhopper	OFF	Crude		.3556		2016	70				
