= Oil megaprojects (2018) =

This page summarizes projects that propose to bring more than 20,000 barrels per day (3,200 m^{3}/d) of new liquid fuel capacity to market with the first production of fuel beginning in 2018. This is part of the Wikipedia summary of Oil Megaprojects.

== Quick links to other years ==
Overview	2003	2004	2005	2006	2007	2008	2009	2010	2011	2012	2013	2014	2015	2016	2017	2018	2019	2020

== Detailed list of projects for 2018 ==
Country	Project name	Year startup	Operator	Area	Type	Grade	2P resvs	GOR	Peak Year	Peak	Discovery	Capital Inv.	Notes	Ref
OPEC
Iran	South Pars Ph 19	2018	PetroPars, IOEC	Offshore	Condensate					77				
Non-OPEC
Canada	Kearl Mine Ph 2	2018	Imperial/ExxonMobil	LAND	Bitumen	Oil Sands				100			Application	
Canada	Long Lake Upgrader Ph 4	2018	OPTI /Nexen	LAND	Bitumen	Oil Sands				0			Mining, Upgrading, No FID, 60 kbd	
Canada	Sunrise Ph 4	2018	Husky Energy		Oil Sands	Bitumen	1.0-2.2			0		suspended 50 kbd	SAGD	
Canada	Gregoire Lake (Phase 2)	2018	CNRL	LAND	Bitumen	Oil Sands				30			In-Situ, Announced	
