= Heavy oil =

Heavy oil may refer to:

- Coal tar creosote, a wood preservative and waterproofing agent
- Diesel fuel
- Fuel oil that contains residual oil left over from petroleum distillation
- Heavy crude oil, viscous crude oil
