= Oil megaprojects (2003) =

This page summarizes projects that brought more than 20,000 barrels per day (3,200 m^{3}/d) of new liquid fuel capacity to market with the first production of fuel beginning in 2003. This is part of the Wikipedia summary of Oil Megaprojects—see that page for further details. 2003 saw 30 projects come on stream with an aggregate capacity of 2.499 million barrels per day (397,300 m^{3}/d) when full production was reached (which may not have been in 2003).

== Quick Links to Other Years ==
Overview	2003	2004	2005	2006	2007	2008	2009	2010	2011	2012	2013	2014	2015	2016	2017	2018	2019	2020

== Detailed Project Table for 2003 ==
Country	Project name	Year startup	Operator	Area	Type	Grade	2P resvs	GOR	Peak Year	Peak	Discovery	Capital Inv.	Notes
OPEC
Algeria	Menzel Ledjmat North	2003							2003	40			
Algeria	Ohanet	10/2003	BHP Billiton	LAND	Cond					30			
Ecuador	Block 16	9/2003	Murphy Oil		Crude	Heavy			2003	52			
Iran	Balal	1/2003	Eni		Crude				3/2004	40			
Iran	Darkhovin Ph I	10/2003	Eni		Crude				2005	55			
Indonesia	West Seno Ph I	8/2003	Unocal		Crude		0.588		2004	40	1998		
Libya	Al Jurf	9/2003	Total		Crude				2007	40			
Libya	Murzuk NC-186 A & D	10/2003	Repsol				0.29		2005	75	2000		
Nigeria	Abo	4/2003	Eni		Crude					70			
Nigeria	Amenam/Kpono	7/2003	Total		Crude	Light (API 45)	0.588		2004	125	1990		
Saudi Arabia	Haradh II	4/2003	Saudi Aramco		Crude	Light (API 32)	3-7			300	1951		
Non-OPEC
Angola	Block 15 Xikomba	2003	ExxonMobil	OFF	Crude	Light (API 34.7)	0.1		2006	90	1999		
Australia	Woollybutt	5/20/2003	Eni		Crude					40			
Brazil	Bijupira-Salema	8/12/2003	Shell	OFF	Crude	Medium (API 28-31)	0.17	438		70	1990		
Canada	Athabasca (Muskeg River)	2003	Shell	LAND	Synthetic crude		1.65		2004	155			
Canada	Syncrude Phase III	2003	Syncrude	LAND	Synthetic crude				2006	100			
Chad	Doba fields	7/2003	ExxonMobil	LAND	Crude	Heavy (API 20.5)	1.0		2005	225			
China	Panyu	2003	Devon Energy	OFF	Crude		66		2005	62	1998		
Eq. Guinea	Zafiro S’th’n	2003	ExxonMobil				0.150			110			
Kazakhstan	Buzachi Peninsula (Alibekmola; Kozhasai)	4/2003	Nelson Resources	LAND	Crude	20 API	0.550			50	1999		
Kazakhstan	Karachaganak Ph II	8/2003	Eni/BG	LAND	Cond/Crude		8.4		2005	100	1979	$5.5b	
Malaysia	Angsi Ph 3	2003	ExxonMobil							30			
Malaysia	Bunga Ph II/III	9/2003	Talisman			Light (36.2 API)			3/2004	60			
Malaysia	West Patricia	5/2003	Murphy Oil		Crude				2003	15			
Norway	Grane	9/2003	StatoilHydro	OFF	Crude	Heavy (19 API)				214			
Norway	Mikkel	2003	StatoilHydro	OFF	Crude					25			
Norway	Ringhorne	2003	ExxonMobil	OFF	Crude					90			
Norway	Fram	10/2003	StatoilHydro	OFF	Crude					60			
Russia	Salym (Upper Salym, West Salym, Vadelyp)	6/2003	Shell/Evikhon	LAND	Crude	API 28	0.774		2009	160		$1.54b	
Russia	South Priobskoye	2003	Gazprom Neft				2.2		2005	220			
Thailand	Platong	2003	Unocal		Crude				9/2005	40			
UK	Penguins	2003	Shell	OFF	Crude					40			
United States	Gunnison (Dawson/Durango)	2003	Kerr McGee							40			
United States	Habanero	12/2003	Murphy Oil	ODW	Crude				2004	34			
United States	Medusa	11/2003	Murphy Oil	ODW	Crude		0.07-0.10		2004	40			
United States	Nakika	2003	Shell				0.300			110			
United States	Princess Phase I	2003	Shell		Crude					55			
Vietnam	Su Tu Den	2003	ConocoPhillips		Crude	Light (36.2 API)				70			

== See also ==
- 2003 world oil market chronology
