= Chicontepec =

Chicontepec can refer to:

- Chicontepec, a municipality in Veracruz, Mexico
- Chicontepec de Tejeda, a town seat of municipality in Veracruz, Mexico
- Chicontepec Formation, a petroleum-producing area of Mexico
