= Oil megaprojects (2020) =

This page summarizes projects that propose to bring more than 20,000 barrels per day (3,200 m^{3}/d) of new liquid fuel capacity to market with the first production of fuel beginning in 2020. This is part of the Wikipedia summary of Oil Megaprojects.

== Quick links to other years ==
Overview	2003	2004	2005	2006	2007	2008	2009	2010	2011	2012	2013	2014	2015	2016	2017	2018	2019	2020

== Detailed list of projects for 2020 ==
Country	Project name	Year startup	Operator	Area	Type	Grade	2P resvs	GOR	Peak Year	Peak	Discovery	Capital Inv.	Notes	Ref
OPEC
Kuwait	Project Kuwait Phase II	2020	KOC	LAND	Crude	Heavy			2020	0			No FID 400 kbd	
Iran	Yadavaran Ph 2	2020	Sinopec	LAND	Crude	Heavy	3.20			100	2000			
Saudi Arabia	Berri Exp	2020	Saudi Aramco	LAND	Crude	Extra Light				0			No FID 300 kbd	
Saudi Arabia	Khurais Exp	2020	Saudi Aramco	LAND	Crude	Light				0			No FID 300 kbd	
Saudi Arabia	Safaniyah Exp	2020	Saudi Aramco	OFF	Crude	Heavy				0			No FID 700 kbd	
Saudi Arabia	Zuluf Exp	2020	Saudi Aramco	OFF	Crude	Medium				0			No FID 900 kbd	
Non-OPEC
Canada	Joslyn Ph 4	2020	CNRL	LAND	Bitumen	Oil sands				0			Application No FID 50 kbd	
Mexico	(Chicontepec) Exp 3	2020	PEMEX	LAND		Heavy	2.287		2024	200		$30B		
United States	(Eagle Ford Shale)	2020	Chesapeake Energy	LAND	Crude	Light			2020	500	2010		JV with CNOOC	
