= Oil megaprojects (2004) =

This page summarizes projects that brought more than 20,000 barrels per day (3,200 m^{3}/d) of new liquid fuel capacity to market with the first production of fuel beginning in 2004. This is part of the Wikipedia summary of Oil Megaprojects—see that page for further details. 2004 saw 24 projects come on stream with an aggregate capacity of 3.357 million barrels per day (533,700 m^{3}/d) when full production was reached (which may not have been in 2004).

== Quick Links to Other Years ==
Overview	2003	2004	2005	2006	2007	2008	2009	2010	2011	2012	2013	2014	2015	2016	2017	2018	2019	2020

== Detailed Project Table for 2004 ==
Country	Project name	Year startup	Operator	Area	Type	Grade	2P resvs	GOR	Peak Year	Peak	Discovery	Capital Inv.	Notes
OPEC
Algeria	Rhourde Oulad Djemma	10/2004	Eni				0.3		2005	80			
Indonesia	Banyu Urip	2004	ExxonMobil				2.0			165			
Indonesia	Belanak	2004	ConocoPhillips				2.0			35			
Iran	Doroud	2004	Total						2006	85			
Kuwait	Sabriya (GC23 Capacity Upgrade)	2005	KOC				4.3			65			
Libya	Elephant NC-174	2/2004	Eni				0.760		2008	150			
Qatar	Al Khaleej Ph 1	9/2004	ExxonMobil		NGL					40			
Qatar	RasGas 3	2/2004			NGL					30			
Saudi Arabia	Qatif Field/Abu-Safah	12/2004	Saudi Aramco							690			
Venezuela	Hamaca Upgrader	8/2004	Chevron				2.0		2005	180		$3.8b	
Non-OPEC
Angola	Block 15 Kizomba A (Chocalho; Hungo)	8/2004	ExxonMobil	ODW	Crude		1.0			250			
Australia	Bayu-Undan	2004	ConocoPhillips						9/2004	200	1995		
Brazil	Barracuda (P-43)	12/2004	Petrobras				0.770		2005	150			
Brazil	Marlim Sul (FPSO-MLS)	6/2004	Petrobras				2.679			100			
Chad	Bolobo	2004							2005	60			
China	Caofedian	7/2004	Kerr McGee				0.7		2005	100			
Syria	Oudeh	2004	Tanganyika							30			
United States	Front Runner	10/2004	Murphy Oil	ODW	Crude		0.15 - 0.2		2005	60	2001		
United States	Llano	4/2004	Shell	ODW			0.04		5/2004	32	12/1998	0.215	
United States	Glider	7/2004	Shell	ODW						20			
United States	Magnolia	2004	ConocoPhillips				0.150		2005	50	1999		
United States	Marco Polo (inc K2, Genghis Khan)	7/2004	Anadarko Petroleum							120			
UK	GoldenEye	10/2004	Shell	OFF	Cond		0.135		2005	30			
Yemen	East Al Hajr (blk 51)	2004	Nexen		Crude					25			

See also the 2004 world oil market chronology

This table is available in csv format here (updated daily).
