= Peregrino =

Oil field in Campos Basin, Brazil

Peregrino oilfield
- Country: Brazil
- Region: Campos Basin
- Block: BM-C-7
- Offshore/onshore: offshore
- Operator: Equinor
- Partners: Equinor, Sinochem

Field history
- Discovery: 2004
- Start of development: 2007
- Start of production: 2011

Production
- Estimated oil in place: 2,300 million barrels (~3.1×10^{8} t)

Peregrino is an oil field (block BM-C-7) located offshore of Brazil, east of Rio de Janeiro, in the southwest part of the Campos Basin area with about 2.3 billion barrels (370×10^{6} m^{3}) of oil in place within the sanctioned area. The oil field was discovered in 2004 and was formerly known as Chinook. In May 2025, it was announced that Brazilian oil company PRIO had acquired the field from Equinor.

== Reserves and production ==
The location is 53 miles (85 km) off the coast, situated in 328 to 390 feet (100 to 119 m) of water. Peregrino is a heavy crude oil of 13. API and with high viscosity. Sulfur content is 1.8% which is considered medium sour. The estimated recoverable volume of crude oil is 300 million barrels (48×10^{6} m^{3}) to 600 million barrels (95×10^{6} m^{3}). The first oil is expected for early 2011, where 5 wells are anticipated for production and production should reach a plateau of 100,000 barrels per day (16,000 m^{3}/d) within the first year with a targeted production of some 120,000 barrels per day (19,000 m^{3}/d) by 2012. The field will be completed in three phases and will include approximately 60 wells; phase one of the project includes 37 wells; 30 production wells and 7 water injection wells. The temperature of the oil, gas, water and sand from the field is 79.6 °C in the reservoir and 60-66 °C on arrival in the ship, and then heated to 130-150 °C for processing (separation). After this, the temperature is kept at 65-70 °C to keep the oil liquid.

== Development ==
The field was originally planned to be operated by Anadarko Petroleum with Statoil as 50%; however, on March 4, 2008, Statoil purchased Anadarko's 50% share of the oil field for US$2.1 billion. At the time of acquiring the license, the field's recovery factor was estimated to be 9%. However, with the current reservoir depletion plan of the field calling for the use of produced water injection and rock compaction, Peregrino's recovery factor has increased to 20%. On 21 May 2010, Statoil agreed to sell 40% stake to Sinochem.

The first phase of the development includes two drilling and wellhead platforms and a ship-shaped floating production, storage and off-take unit (FPSO) called Maersk Peregrino built in Singapore. It is 345 m long, cost 1B euros and is powered by 72 MW steam turbines fueled by gas from the field.

The platforms are tied back to the FPSO by flowlines and power umbilicals. Project requires extensive sub-surface and reservoir management skills such as produced water injection, horizontal wells and flow assurance to sustain the project over a longer-term.

With the 2015 reservoir depletion plan of the field calling for the use of produced water injection and rock compaction, Peregrino's recovery factor increased to 20%.

In May 2025, it was announced that Brazilian independent oil company PRIO was acquiring the field from Equinor.

== Contractors ==
The project commenced in February 2007, when South Atlantic Holding and Maersk Contractors signed an agreement to perform a FEED study for the project. Shortly after the FEED, a contract was awarded to Maersk Contractors (now Maersk FPSOs) for the provision of the FPSO and for 15 years of operation of the FPSO.

Aker Solutions will perform the mooring installation work – the first marine installation job for Aker Solutions in Brazil. The scope of work comprises planning and installation of a submerged turret production (STP) buoy with mooring system using ten mooring lines with 90-tonne piles, heavy chain and wire. The operations were scheduled to be conducted during Q4 2009.

APL (a subsidiary of National Oilwell Varco) will provide the submerged turret production and mooring system for the Peregrino FPSO.

Kiewit Offshore Services was selected for the engineering, procurement, and construction of the two large 6,500-ton decks and two jackets, 6,600 and 7,000 tons respectfully. Additional scope also includes the fabrication of two piles weighing a total of 5,600 tons.

Subsea 7 received a contract for the engineering, procurement, construction and installation of the pipelines connecting the two platforms to the FPSO. Another contract was awarded to Kiewit Offshore Services Ltd. for the supply of two drilling platforms for the field.

FMC Technologies will manufacture and install the surface wellheads and surface production trees for the Peregrino project.

Wood Group Brasil was selected by Statoil to provide operations, maintenance and modification services for the two Peregrino wellhead platforms. The five-year contract is valued at approximately US$60 million. Wood Group Brasil's project scope includes both offshore services and onshore support, and covers all production processes and equipment except drilling services. The project will be managed by Wood Group Brasil's existing management team, and more than 50 local workers will be hired for operations, maintenance, engineering and other positions.

William Jacob Management, Inc. were awarded the engineering, procurement and construction management by Statoil for the provision of the drilling facilities.

Siem Consub will provide maritime support for the initial two years under a renewable contract for an additional year. The PSV-ship will be available beginning in the first quarter of 2010. Seawell, a Seadrill subsidiary, will manage the drilling campaign at a cost of US$90 million.
