= Muskeg River Mine Cogeneration Station =

- Country: Canada
- Location: Wood Buffalo, north of Fort McMurray, Alberta
- Coordinates: 57.2563°N 111.5063°W
- Status: Operational
- Commission date: 2003
- Owner: Heartland Generation

Thermal power station
- Primary fuel: Natural gas
- Turbine technology: Gas turbine

Power generation
- Nameplate capacity: 172 MW

Muskeg River Mine (MRM) Cogeneration Station is a natural gas-fired station owned by Heartland Generation, located 75 km north of Fort McMurray and is part of the Albian Sands Project.

== Description ==
The MRM Cogeneration Station consists of:

- 2 - GE 7EA gas-fired turbine and generator sets with low nitrous oxide burners
- 2 - Heat recovery steam generators
- 2 - Standby auxiliary gas-fired boilers.
