= Fairmount Heavy Transport =

Fairmount Heavy Transport N.V.
- Company type: Public (OSE: FAIR)
- Industry: Shipping
- Founded: 2005
- Headquarters: Rotterdam, Netherlands
- Area served: Global
- Services: Heavy transport vessels
- Website: www.fairmountht.com

Fairmount Heavy Transport is a Dutch shipping company that operates two semi-submersible heavy transport vessels, Fairmount Fjord and Fairmount Fjell. Both are being converted at Malta Shipyards in 2007/2008. Commercial management is performed by Fairmount Heavy Transport itself, since 1 August 2007 independently from Fairmount Marine. Fairmount Heavy Transport was founded in 2005 and based in Rotterdam. It is listed on the Oslo Stock Exchange.

In the United States and in maritime law, Fairmount Heavy Transport is known as the defendant in Transportes Navieros y Terrestres S.A. de C.V. v. Fairmount Heavy Transport, N.V., a 2009 case heard in the Southern District of New York involving a dispute over liability for the wrongful arrest of a vessel.
