= Abu Safah field =

Oil field between Bahrain and Saudi Arabia

The Abu Safah field (Arabic: حقل أبو سعفة) is a joint petroleum reservoir between the waters of Bahrain and Saudi Arabia. Discovered in 1963, the field began production in 1966. It is managed by Saudi Aramco and has a capacity of 300,000 barrel/day of medium petroleum.

== Location ==
The Abu Safah field, which began production in 1966, is located in the waters of the Persian Gulf, southeast of the Berri field, and is jointly owned by the Kingdoms of Saudi Arabia and Bahrain. The current Abu Safah facilities contain ten platforms, each with six wells and five sub-platforms with their own wells within.

== History ==
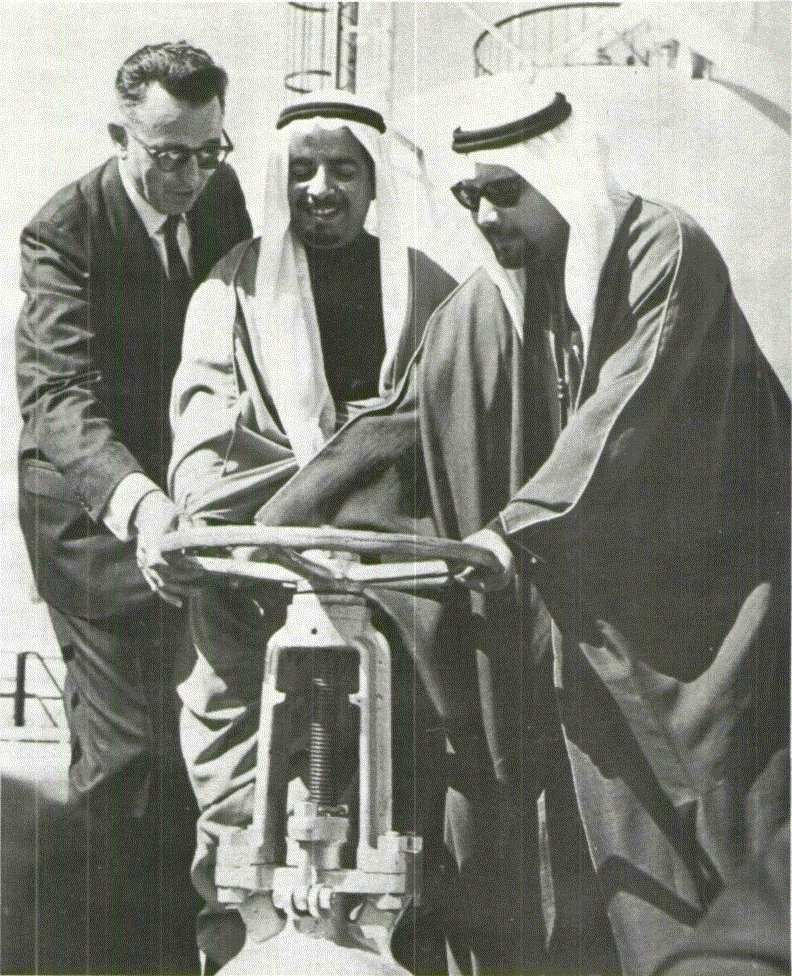
On February 7, 1966, Abu Sa'fah oil field began operations with a ceremonial pipeline opening to Ras Tanura, attended by Aramco President Thomas C. Barger, Bahrain's Shaykh Khalifah ibn Salman, and Saudi Petroleum Minister Ahmed Zaki Yamani

The Abu Safah field contains 6.1 billion barrels of oil and is 19 kilometres (12 mi) long and 10 kilometres (6.2 mi) wide. Discovered in 1963 and beginning production in 1966, the field helped spur expansion of the Qatif Project from 150,000 barrels/day to its current 300,000 barrels/day capacity.

Since 1996, the Kingdom has granted all production in the field to Bahrain, but Saudi Aramco markets it through the port of Ras Tanura and distributes the revenues equally between the two. Before this, Bahrain would produce 37,000 barrels/day and import up to 217,000 barrels/day through an undersea pipeline between Saudi Arabia and a refinery on the Bahraini island of Sitra.

=== Development ===
The Abu Safah reached its full 300,000 barrels/day in 2004, after $1.2 billion was spent to raise the capacity to that level.
