= Oil megaprojects (2019) =

This page summarizes projects that propose to bring more than 20,000 barrels per day (3,200 m^{3}/d) of new liquid fuel capacity to market with the first production of fuel beginning in 2019. This is part of the Wikipedia summary of oil megaprojects.

== Quick links to other years ==
Overview	2003	2004	2005	2006	2007	2008	2009	2010	2011	2012	2013	2014	2015	2016	2017	2018	2019	2020

== Detailed list of projects for 2019 ==
Country	Project name	Year startup	Operator	Area	Type	Grade	2P resvs	GOR	Peak Year	Peak	Discovery	Capital Inv.	Notes	Ref
OPEC
Non-OPEC
Canada	Joslyn Ph 3	2019	CNRL	LAND	Bitumen	Oil sands				0			Application No FID 50 kbd	
United States	Anchor	2024	Chevron	ODW	Oil		440				2014	$5.7 B	First ultra-high-pressure (20,000 psi operating pressure) field sanction in the world.	[2]
