= Oil megaprojects =

Large oil field projects

Oil megaprojects are large oil field projects.

== Summary of megaprojects ==
Definition of megaproject: 20,000 barrels per day (3,200 m3/d) of new liquid fuel capacity.

=== Megaprojects predicted for individual years ===
| Overview | 2003 | 2004 | 2005 | 2006 | 2007 | 2008 | 2009 | 2010 | 2011 | 2012 | 2013 | 2014 | 2015 | 2016 | 2017 | 2018 | 2019 | 2020 |

== Application to oil supply forecasting ==
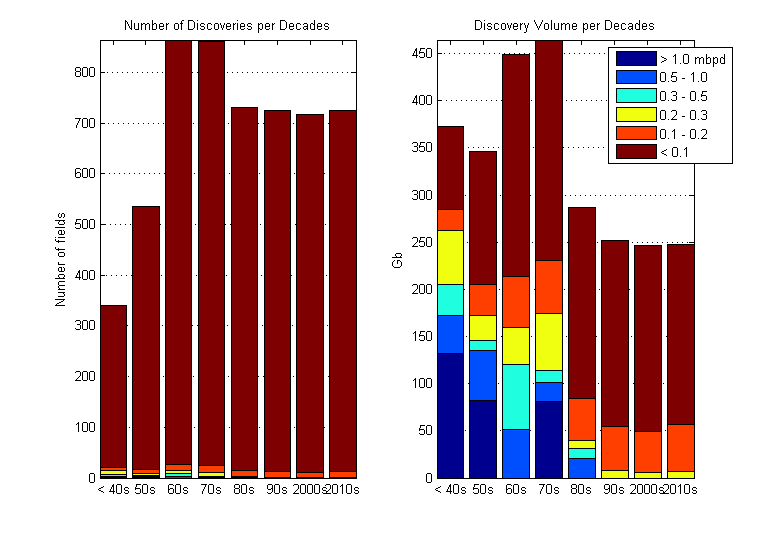
Number of oil fields discovered per decades grouped by average flow rates (left) and corresponding oil volumes (right) in giga-barrels (Gb). Data taken from the annexe B of Twilight in the Desert by Matthew Simmons.

A series of project tabulations and analyses by Chris Skrebowski, editor of Petroleum Review, have presented a more pessimistic picture of future oil supply. In a 2004 report, based on an analysis of new projects over 100,000 barrels per day (16,000 m^{3}/d), he argued that although ample supply might be available in the near-term, after 2007 "the volumes of new production for this period are well below likely requirements." By 2006, although "the outlook for future supply appears somewhat brighter than even six months ago", nonetheless, if "all the factors reducing new capacity come into play, markets will remain tight and prices high. Only if new capacity flows into the system rather more rapidly than of late, will there be any chance of rebuilding spare capacity and softening prices."

The smallest fields, even in aggregate, do not contribute a large fraction of the total. For example, a relatively small number of giant and super-giant oilfields are providing almost half of the world production.

=== Decline rates ===
The most important variable is the average decline rate for Fields in Production (FIP) which is difficult to assess.

== See also ==
- Energy law
- List of largest oil fields
- Giant oil and gas fields
- List of Russian megaprojects
