= Synthetic crude =

Bitumen or extra heavy crude oil upgraded for transport

Synthetic crude is the output from a bitumen/extra heavy oil upgrader facility used in connection with oil sand production. It may also refer to shale oil, an output from an oil shale pyrolysis. The properties of the synthetic crude depend on the processes used in the upgrading. Typically, it is low in sulfur (known as a sweet crude) and has an API gravity of around 30 (known as a light crude). It is also known as "upgraded crude", as it is still a crude oil, but has been upgraded to change a naturally occurring heavy crude into a lighter, sweeter product suitable for further processing by conventional refineries built to handle naturally occurring light sweet crude.

Synthetic crude is an intermediate product produced when an extra-heavy or unconventional oil source is upgraded into a transportable form. Synthetic crude is then shipped to oil refineries where it is refined into finished products. Synthetic crude may also be mixed, as a diluent, with heavy oil to create synbit. Synbit is more viscous than synthetic crude, but can also be a less expensive alternative for transporting heavy oil to a conventional refinery.

Syncrude Canada, Suncor Energy Inc., and Canadian Natural Resources Limited are the three largest worldwide producers of synthetic crude with a cumulative production of approximately 600,000 barrels per day (95,000 m^{3}/d). The NewGrade Energy Upgrader became operational in 1988, and was the first upgrader in Canada, now part of the Co-op Refinery Complex.

"Synthetic crude" may also refer to crude-like hydrocarbon mixes generated from other processes. Examples are manure-derived synthetic crude oil and greencrude.

== See also ==
- Albian Sands
- Canadian Centre for Energy Information
- History of the petroleum industry in Canada (oil sands and heavy oil)
- Scotford Upgrader
- Suncor
- Syncrude
