= Fairmount Marine =

Fairmount Marine B.V.
- Company type: subsidiary of Boskalis
- Industry: Shipping
- Genre: ship owner
- Founder: Henk J. van den Berg
- Headquarters: Papendrecht, Netherlands
- Area served: Global
- Services: Ocean towage
- Website: www.fairmount.nl

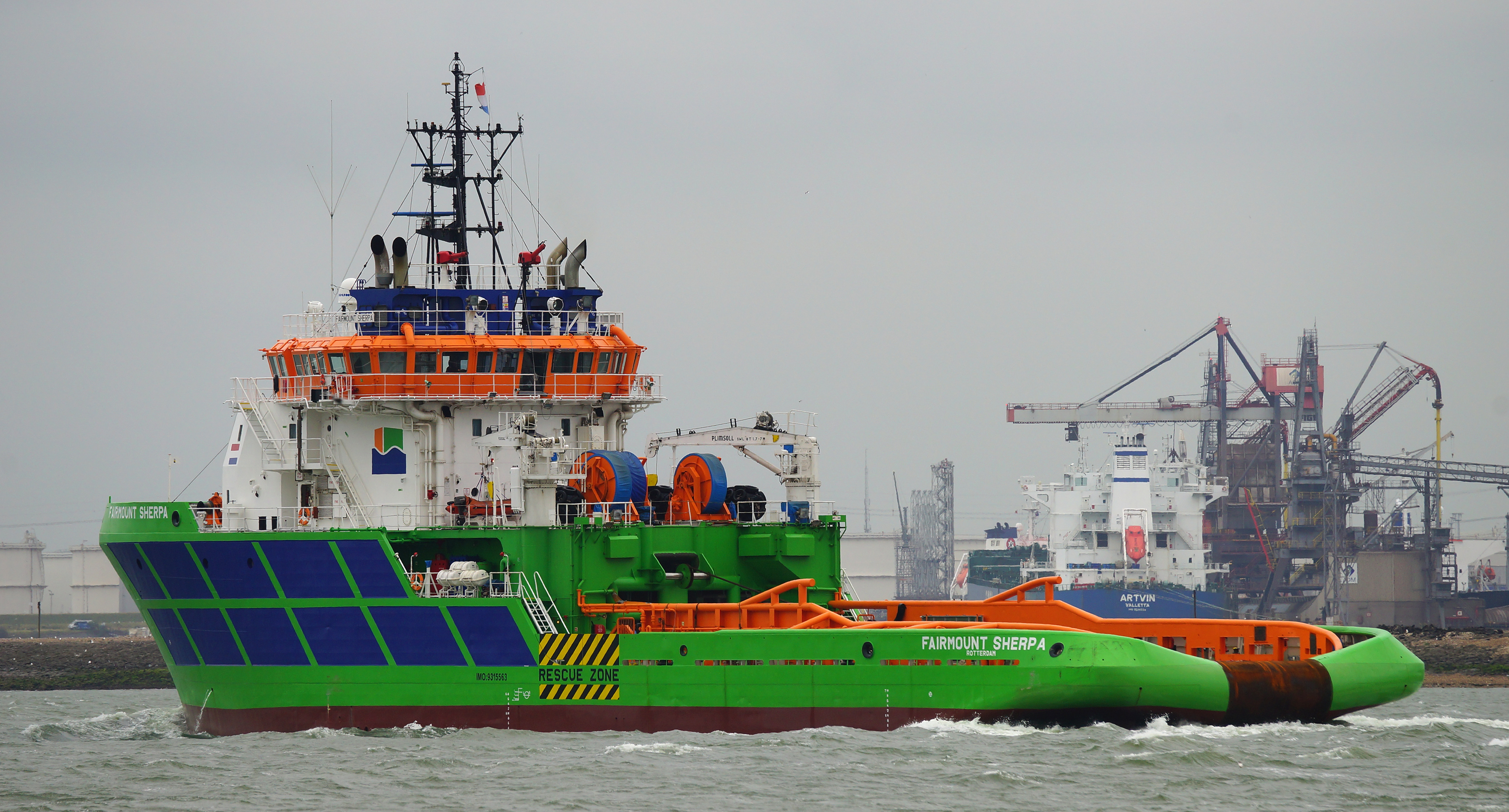

Fairmount Marine is a shipping company in the Koninklijke Boskalis Westminster N.V. group. The company operates 11 heavy transport vessels, including two self-propelled semi-submersible ships which are owned by Fairmount Heavy Transport. The mother group operates six anchor handling tug supply vessels and three semi-submerisible barges. The main operations involves transport of offshore installations such as Floating production storage and offloading vessels.

The company was founded in 1980. In 2007, Fairmount Marine was acquired by Paris-based Louis Dreyfus Armateurs. In 2014, Dreyfus sold Fairmount to the Dutch Royal Boskalis, so that the Fairmount brand was abandoned in favor of Boskalis.
