= ATP Oil and Gas =

Defunct American energy company

ATP Oil & Gas Corporation
- Type: Public
- Industry: Oil and gas industry
- Founded: 1991
- Founder: T. Paul Buhlman
- Defunct: 2012
- Headquarters: Houston, Texas, U.S.
- Key people: T. Paul Bulmahn, Chairman and CEO; Leland E. Tate, President; Albert L. Reese, Jr., CFO; Treasurer; John E. Tschirhart, Senior Vice President
- Products: Crude oil Natural gas
- Revenue: ▲US$312M (FY 2009)
- Operating income: ▼US$-15.1M (FY 2009)
- Net income: ▼US$-49.0M (FY 2009)
- Total assets: ▲US$2.80B (FY 2009)
- Total equity: ▲US$596M (FY 2009)
- Number of employees: 64

ATP Oil & Gas Corporation was a Houston, Texas based company that develops and produces oil and natural gas in the Gulf of Mexico and the North Sea. It specialized in developing reserves.

== History ==
ATP Oil & Gas was founded in 1991. The company acquires and develops off shore properties in the Gulf of Mexico and North Sea with proven but as yet undeveloped oil and gas reserves, called PUD in the industry. The company has a 97% success rate in this objective. The success rate has increased as more powerful seismic technologies have become available.

On August 18, 2012, ATP Oil & Gas filed for Chapter 11 bankruptcy protection.

== Worldwide exposure ==
ATP has leasehold and other interests in 50 offshore blocks in the Gulf of Mexico, 12 blocks in the North Sea, of which 11 are in the United Kingdom controlled sector and one in the Netherlands controlled sector.

== Innovative and notable technology developed ==
The company has developed refinements to existing technology including developing a subsea well in 500 feet (150 m) of water with an 11-mile (18 km) pipeline and an umbilical controlled by direct hydraulics, which as, at the time, the longest direct hydraulic system in the world. Previously it was thought that direct hydraulics could not be used for distances beyond five to seven miles (11 km). ATP was awarded Best Field Improvement Project 1999 for this innovation by Hart's Oil and Gas World magazine.

ATP set a new world record for the Longest Subsea Oil Tieback at its Ladybug wells in Garden Banks Block 409 in the Gulf of Mexico. About 91,865 ft (28,000 m) of 6-in. pipe were laid in 1,360 ft (410 m) waters to tie the Ladybug wells to the Garden Banks 189 “A” platform.

The company also incorporates networking and the internet communication. This results in the company operating 17 unmanned platforms dramatically lowering costs. The company received the Inc./Cisco Growing with Technology Award 2000 for this accomplishment.

== Largest Volvo overseas delivery car order in history ==
In 2006, on behalf of its employees, the company placed the largest single non-fleet order for overseas delivery in the Volvo carmaker's history. Every employee of the company was given the option to receive a new Volvo car and a trip to Sweden.

This record order was a result of a challenge made by the company to its employees to reach certain corporate goals for the year. The challenge was that if the goals were met, every employee regardless of rank or job description would receive a new 2006 Volvo S60 sedan and a trip to Sweden to take delivery of the car. Paul Bulmahn, the chairman and President of the company disqualified himself from receiving the bonus.

Production goals included:

- beginning production of the deepwater Mississippi Canyon Block 711 field, also known as Gomez,
- increasing the company's production of natural gas to 160 million cubic feet (4,500,000 m^{3}) per day (nearly a triple production of the previous year),
- obtaining a 200% reserve replacement (the goal was exceeded with a replacement rate of 1,367% rate),
- completing six Gulf of Mexico and three North Sea projects

== Location, management and key personnel ==
ATP was headquartered in Houston, Texas. It had additional offices in Guildford, Surrey, United Kingdom and IJmuiden, Netherlands. T. Paul Bulmahn was the founder and owns approximately 24% of shares. Effective May 21, 2008, Leland E. Tate, previously the Chief Operating Officer, was promoted to the position of President of the company. Additionally, George R. Morris, previously the Vice President, Acquisitions, assumed the role of ATP Chief Operating Officer. T. Paul Bulmahn continued with ATP as chief executive officer and chairman of the board.
