= Qatif Project =

Oilfield development project in Saudi Arabia

Saudi Aramco's Qatif Project is an oilfield development project in Qatif, Eastern Province, Saudi Arabia, operated by the country's national oil company Saudi Aramco.

== Qatif Producing Plants ==
The Qatif Producing Plants are the largest crude increment built in recent times, and the world's largest crude production facility. The completion of the project added 650,000 barrels per day (103,000 m^{3}/d) to the 150,000 barrels per day (24,000 m^{3}/d) already produced from the Abu Safah field.

=== Production ===
The Qatif Producing Plants produce:

- 800,000 barrels per day (130,000 m^{3}/d) of crude oil, 500,000 coming from Qatif field, and 300,000 from Abu Safah offshore
- 370 million cubic feet per day (10×10^{6} m^{3}/d) of associated natural gas.
- 40,000 barrels per day (6,400 m^{3}/d) of high-value hydrocarbon condensate.
- 1,800 metric tons of sulfur per day.

=== Technology ===
The project took three million man-hours to design and 70 million man-hours to construct. It brought with it the latest technological advancements to increase operational efficiency as well as environmental safety. This ranged from an onshore smokeless flare system, to a 99 percent effective sulfur recovery system at the Berri Gas Plant that uses technology to make it the cleanest operating plant of all Saudi Aramco facilities. The Berri gas plant was expanded by Technip.

The gas and oil separation plant (GOSP) was constructed by CB&I.

== Qatif Field ==
The Qatif field, north of Dhahran and not far from Ras Tanura, amounts to more than 500 square kilometres (190 sq mi), including northern and southern dome structures. The onshore component of the project will provide 500,000 barrels (79,000 m^{3}) per day of Arabian Light Crude barrels per day of Arabian Medium.

The field development services were provided by Halliburton.
