= Dalia oil field =

Oil field near Cabinda, Angola

Dalia Oil Field
- Country: Angola
- Block: Block 17
- Offshore/onshore: offshore
- Operator: Total S.A.
- Partners: Total S.A., Statoil, ExxonMobil, BP

Field history
- Discovery: September 1997
- Start of production: December 2006

Production
- Current production of oil: 240,000 barrels per day (~1.2×10^{7} t/a)
- Estimated oil in place: 1,000 million barrels (~1.4×10^{8} t)

The Dalia Oil Field is an oil field in deepwater block 17, 135 kilometres (84 mi) off the coast of Cabinda, Angola. The field lies in water depths varying between 1,200 and 1,500 metres (3,900 and 4,900 ft). Dalia oil field was discovered in September 1997 and brought into production in December 2006.

== Operator ==
Sonangol is the Block 17 concessionaire. Like other developments in the Block 17, the operator is Total S.A. with interest of 40%, and other partners are Statoil of Norway (23.33%), ExxonMobil of the United States (20%) and BP of the United Kingdom (16.67%).

== Facility ==
Dalia Field has been developed with an FPSO capable of processing 240,000 barrels per day (38,000 m^{3}/d), and with a storage capacity of 2 million barrels (320×10^{3} m^{3}) of oil. The FPSO hull was built in South Korea by Samsung Heavy Industries and has a hull dimensions of 300 metres (980 ft) in length, 60 metres (200 ft) in breadth and 32 metres (105 ft) high. On top of this is 29,400 tonnes of processing facilities which was mainly built and installed at DSME in South Korea. It will have a water injection capacity of 405,000 barrels per day (64,400 m^{3}/d), water treatment capacity of 265,000 barrels per day (42,100 m^{3}/d) and gas compression capacity of 8×10^{6} cu ft/d (230,000 m^{3}/d). There will be a total installed power capacity of 66 MW. The living quarters will hold up to 120 people and can be increased to 190 during shutdowns. The structure has a design working life of 20 years. The Dalia subsea production system has 350 wells, consisting of 34 production wells and 30 water injection wells and 3 gas injection wells.

The wells are highly deviated, i.e. they are almost horizontal in the reservoirs. One major aspect of the well programme is the large-scale use of horizontal Christmas trees designed to allow wells to be drilled through them These are being drilled with two rigs, Pride Africa and Pride Angola, in tandem for the initial 18 months of the campaign of which will require some 2,500 days in all.

== Reservoir ==
Dalia is projected to contain about 1 billion barrels (160×10^{6} m^{3}) of crude oil (Angola has a projected 13 billion barrels (2.1×10^{9} m^{3}) of recoverable petroleum). The Dalia field has three main reservoirs and the adjacent Camelia reservoir. These reservoirs were formed more than 25 million years ago by the accumulation of sediment at the mouth of the Congo River. Today, they lie not very far (about 800 metres (2,600 ft)) below the seabed, forming reservoirs that contain a viscous (between 21° and 23° API) oil at relatively low temperatures of between 45 °C and 50 °C. Associated gas will not be flared but reinjected, thus contributing to maintaining the pressure of the field.

The start-up of Dalia coincided with Angola's entry into the Organization of Petroleum Exporting Countries (OPEC). Dalia is projected to produce at its peak about 240,000 barrels per day (38,000 m^{3}/d) of oil.
