= Albian Sands =

Canadian oil sands mining company

Coordinates: 57.3°N 111.5°W

Albian Sands Energy Inc.
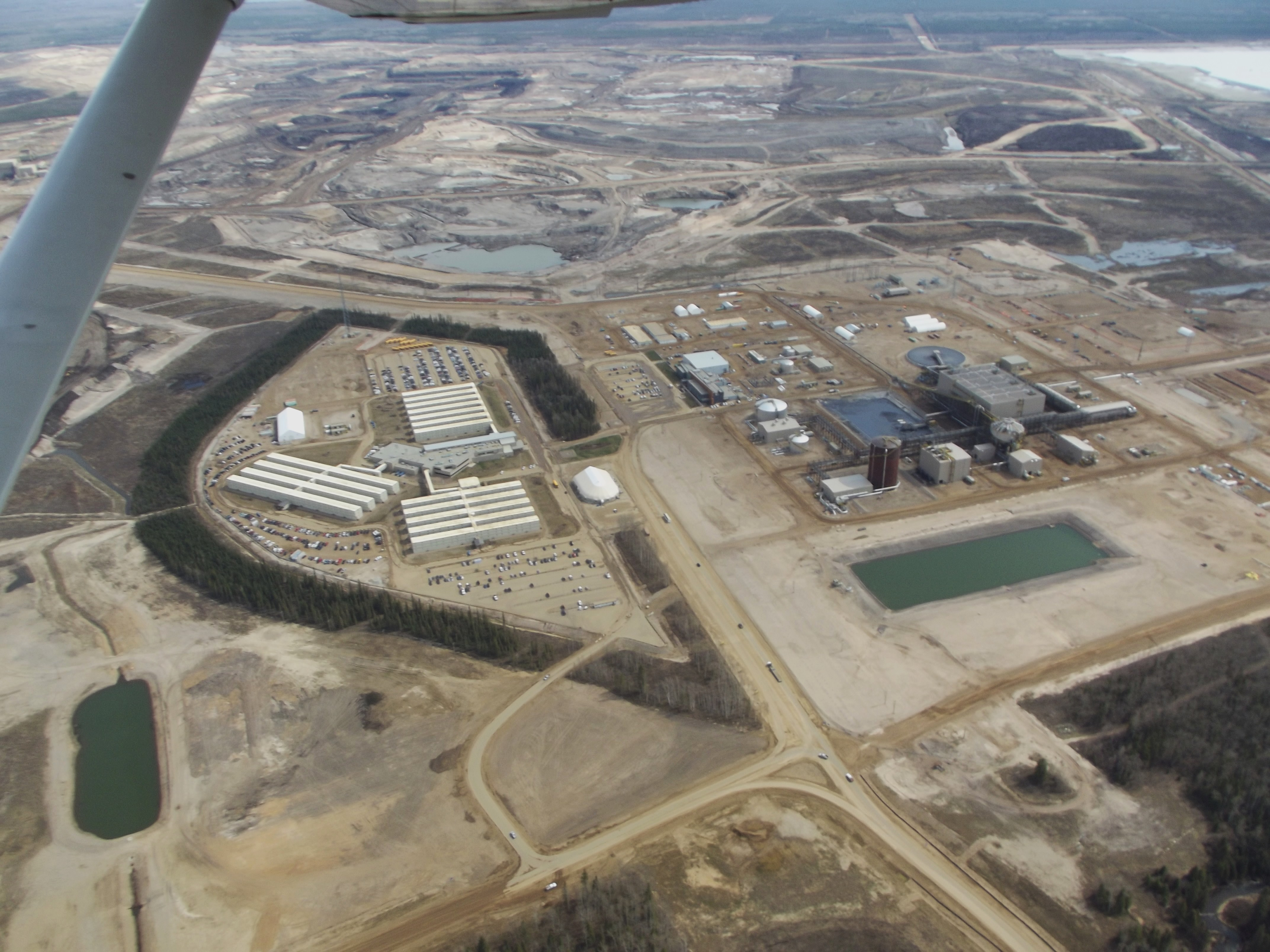
- CNRL Albian Village and Jack Pine Mine, north east of Fort McMurray, Alberta Canada
- Company type: Joint venture
- Industry: Mining
- Headquarters: Calgary, Canada
- Area served: Canada
- Owner: Shell Canada (10%); CNRL (70%); Chevron Canada (20%)

Albian Sands Energy Inc. is a mining company which operates the Muskeg River Mine and Jack Pine Mine, an oil sands mining project located 75 kilometres (47 mi) north of Fort McMurray, Alberta, Canada. It is a joint venture between Shell Canada (10%), CNRL (70%) and Chevron Canada (20%).

The company's legal headquarters are located in the Shell Centre in Calgary, Alberta. Albian Sands got its name from the Albian Boreal Sea, which during the Albian age of the Cretaceous (over 100 million years ago), moved over the McMurray sands and deposited a blanket of marine shale on its floor which trapped the hydrocarbons of the McMurray Formation. The oil sands resources of the Muskeg River Mine are a legacy of the Albian Sea.

At full production, Albian Sands can produce 340,000 barrels per day (54,000 m^{3}/d) of crude bitumen, a naturally occurring semi-solid form of crude oil. The mine product, diluted bitumen or dilbit, is sent to be upgraded at the Scotford Upgrader in Fort Saskatchewan. The Muskeg River Mine stands on a Shell Canada lease containing more than 5 billion barrels (790,000,000 m^{3}) of mineable bitumen, of which it is expected to recover 1,650 million barrels (262,000,000 m^{3}) of bitumen over the next 30 years. The Muskeg River Mine, Jack Pine Mine and the Scotford Upgrader together comprise the "Athabasca Oil Sands Project (AOSP)".

A proposed future mine expansion would increase production by 100,000 bbl/day. The 100,000 barrels per day (16,000 m^{3}/d) (incremental) expansion project received regulatory approval in late 2006.

At the mine site, the 175 megawatt MRM Cogeneration plant owned 70% by ATCO Power and 30% by SaskPower supplies process steam and electricity to the mine. 50% of the electricity produced is surplus to mine needs and is sold into the Alberta power grid. The Corridor Pipeline which transports diluted bitumen from the Muskeg River Mine to the Scotford Upgrader is owned by Inter Pipeline Ltd. To accommodate its workforce, the project has built a 2460-room "village" with service and recreation facilities.

The project is using satellite based imaging to ensure transparent reporting of its land use.
