= Chicontepec Formation =

Petroleum system in Mexico

- Country: Mexico
- Region: Veracruz; Puebla; Hidalgo
- Operator: Pemex

Field history
- Discovery: 1926

Production
- Estimated oil in place: 139,000 million barrels (~1.90×10^{10} t)
- Recoverable oil: 19,000 million barrels (~2.6×10^{9} t)

The Chicontepec Basin (Chicontepec Formation) is a petroleum system in Mexico north-east of Mexico City, covering an area of around 3,800 square kilometres (1,500 sq mi) in the states of Veracruz, Puebla and Hidalgo. Several oil fields have been discovered in that area since 1926. A major field was discovered in 1973 but contains extra heavy crude, which due to special refining needs is considered unviable at this time. Since that time, tiny amounts of oil have been produced. While the reserves are overwhelmingly extra heavy crude, pockets of lighter tight oil, as well as natural gas, are also found in the basin.

== Attempts at increasing output ==
In March 2006, Mexican President Vicente Fox announced that Pemex would invest US$37.5 billion over the next 20 years on the oil fields of Chicontepec. It was hoped that this will boost output to 1 million barrels per day (160×10^{3} m^{3}/d). Pemex's chief executive estimates that 20,000 wells are to be drilled in order to exploit this field.

Intensive drilling has taken place in Chicontepec in recent years, starting with a contract for 500 new wells offered in December 2008. However, results in terms of output have been disappointing, with the field still yielding a modest 68,000 barrels per day (10,800 m^{3}/d) in May 2012.

== See also ==
- Petroleum industry in Mexico
