= Heavy crude oil =

Highly viscous liquid fossil fuel

Heavy crude oil (or extra heavy crude oil) is highly viscous oil that cannot easily flow from production wells under normal reservoir conditions. It is referred to as "heavy" because its density or specific gravity is higher than that of light crude oil. Heavy crude oil has been defined as any liquid petroleum with an API gravity less than 20°. Physical properties that differ between heavy crude oils and lighter grades include higher viscosity and specific gravity, as well as higher molecular weight hydrocarbon composition. In 2010, the World Energy Council (WEC) defined extra heavy oil as crude oil having a gravity of less than 10° and a reservoir viscosity of more than 10,000 centipoises. When reservoir viscosity measurements are not available, extra heavy oil is considered by the WEC to have a lower limit of 4° API; in other words, oil with a density greater than 1000 kg/m^{3} (or a specific gravity greater than 1) and a reservoir viscosity of more than 10,000 centipoises. Heavy oils and asphalt are dense nonaqueous phase liquids (DNAPLs). They have a low solubility and a viscosity greater than, and density higher than, water. Large spills of DNAPL will quickly penetrate the full depth of a water body and accumulate at the bottom.

== Reserves ==
According to the World Resources Institute, concentrations of remarkable quantities of heavy oil and oil sands are found in Canada and Venezuela. The U.S. Energy Information Administration reported in 2001 that the largest reserves of heavy crude oil in the world were located north of the Orinoco River, in the 270-mile long by 40-mile wide Orinoco Belt in eastern Venezuela. At that time Venezuela began authorizing "joint ventures to upgrade the extra-heavy crude resources." Petroleos de Venezuela, S.A. at that time estimated that there were 270 billion barrels of recoverable reserves in the area, the same amount as the conventional oil reserves of Saudi Arabia. The Orinoco Belt is sometimes described as oil sands, but these deposits are non-bituminous, falling instead into the category of heavy or extra-heavy oil due to their lower viscosity. Thirty or more countries are known to have reserves.

== Extraction ==
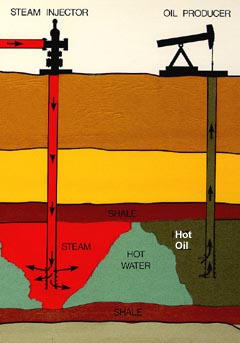
Steam is injected into many oil fields where the oil is thicker and heavier than normal crude oil

Production of heavy oil is becoming more common in many countries, with 2008 production led by Canada and Venezuela. Methods for extraction include cold heavy oil production with sand, steam-assisted gravity drainage, steam injection, vapor extraction, toe-to-heel air injection, and open-pit mining for extremely sandy and oil-rich deposits.

Production, transportation, and refining of heavy crude oil present special challenges compared to light crude oil. Generally, a diluent is added at regular distances in a pipeline carrying heavy crude to facilitate its flow. Dilbit (diluted bitumen) is a means of transporting highly viscous hydrocarbons. Per the Alberta Oil Sands Bitumen Valuation Methodology, "Dilbit Blends" means "Blends made from heavy crudes and/or bitumens and a diluent usually condensate, for the purpose of meeting pipeline viscosity and density specifications, where the density of the diluent included in the blend is less than 800 kg/m^{3}."

=== Environmental impact ===
With current production and transportation methods, heavy crudes have more severe environmental impacts than light ones. With more difficult production comes the employment of a variety of enhanced oil recovery techniques, including steam flooding and tighter well spacing, often as close as one well per acre. Heavy crude oils also carry contaminants. For example, Orinoco extra heavy oil contains 4.5% sulfur as well as vanadium and nickel. However, because crude oil is refined before use, generating specific alkanes via cracking and fractional distillation, this comparison is not valid in a practical sense. Heavy crude refining techniques may require more energy input though, so its environmental impact is presently more significant than that of lighter crude if the intended final products are light hydrocarbons (gasoline motor fuels). On the other hand, heavy crude is a better source for road asphalt mixes than light crude.

With present technology, the extraction and refining of heavy oils and oil sands generates as much as three times the total CO_{2} emissions when compared with conventional oil, primarily driven by the extra energy consumption of the extraction process (which may include burning natural gas to heat and pressurize the reservoir to stimulate flow). Current research into better production methods seek to reduce this environmental impact.

In a 2009 report, the National Toxics Network, citing data provided by the Carbon Dioxide Information Analysis Center of the government of the United States and the Canadian Association of Petroleum Producers, stated that emissions of CO_{2} per unit of energy produced were ~84% of those for coal (0.078/0.093) - higher than CO_{2} emissions of conventional oil.

Environmental Research Web has reported that "because of the energy needed for extraction and processing, petroleum from Canadian oil sands has higher life cycle emission" compared with conventional fossil fuels; "up to 25% more."

== Economics ==
Heavy crude oils provide an interesting situation for the economics of petroleum development. The resources of heavy oil in the world are more than twice those of conventional light crude oil. In October 2009, the United States Geological Survey updated the Orinoco deposits recoverable value to 513 billion barrels (8.16×10^{10} m^{3}), making this area one of the world's largest recoverable oil deposits. However, recovery rates for heavy oil are often limited from 5-30% of oil in place. The chemical makeup is often the defining variable in recovery rates. New technology utilized for the recovery of heavy oil is constantly increasing recovery rates.

On one hand, due to increased refining costs and high sulfur content for some sources, heavy crudes are often priced at a discount to lighter ones. The increased viscosity and density also makes production more difficult (see reservoir engineering). On the other hand, large quantities of heavy crudes have been discovered in the Americas, including Canada, Venezuela and California. The relatively shallow depth of heavy oil fields—often less than 3,000 ft (910 m)—can contribute to lower production costs; however, these are offset by the difficulties of production and transport that render conventional production methods ineffective. Specialized techniques are being developed for exploration and production of heavy oil.

== Properties ==
Heavy oil can be found in shallow, young reservoirs, with rocks from the Pleistocene, Pliocene, and Miocene (younger than 25 million years). In some cases, it can also be found in older Cretaceous, Mississippian, and Devonian reservoirs.

Heavy oil is asphaltic and contains asphaltenes and resins. Its density and viscosity are the result of the high ratio of aromatics and naphthenes to linear alkanes and high levels of NSOs (nitrogen, sulfur, oxygen and heavy metals). Heavy oil has a higher percentage of compounds with over 60 carbon atoms and hence a high boiling point and molecular weight. For example, the viscosity of Orinoco extra-heavy crude oil lies in the range 1,000 to 5,000 cP (1 to 5 Pa·s), while Canadian extra-heavy crude has a viscosity in the range 5000 to 10,000 cP (5 to 10 Pa·s), about the same as molasses, and higher (up to 100,000 cP or 100 Pa·s for the most viscous commercially exploitable deposits). A definition from the Chevron Phillips Chemical company is as follows:

The "heaviness" of heavy oil is primarily the result of a relatively high proportion of a mixed bag of complex, high molecular weight, non-paraffinic compounds and a low proportion of volatile, low molecular weight compounds. Heavy oils typically contain very little paraffin and may or may not contain high levels of asphaltenes.

Heavy crude oils are generally categorized in two ways:

1. Those that have over 1% sulfur (high sulfur crude oils), with aromatics and asphaltenes. These are mostly found in North America (Canada (Alberta, Saskatchewan), United States (California), Mexico), South America (Venezuela, Colombia, and Ecuador) and the Middle East (Kuwait, Saudi Arabia).
2. Those that have less than 1% sulfur (low sulfur crude oils), with aromatics, naphthenes, and resins; these are mostly found in Western Africa (Chad), Central Africa (Angola), and East Africa (Madagascar).

== Related substances ==
Heavy crude oil is closely related to natural bitumen from oil sands. Petroleum geologists categorize bitumen from oil sands as extra heavy oil because its density is less than 10° API. Bitumen is the heaviest, thickest form of petroleum. According to the U.S. Geological Survey, bitumen is further distinguished as extra heavy oil with a higher viscosity (i.e., resistance to flow): "Natural bitumen, also called tar sands or oil sands, shares the attributes of heavy oil but is yet more dense and viscous. Natural bitumen is oil having a viscosity greater than 10,000 centipoises." Natural bitumen and heavy oil differ from light oils by their high viscosity at reservoir temperatures, high density (low API gravity), and significant contents of nitrogen, oxygen, and sulfur compounds and heavy-metal contaminants. They resemble the residuum from the refining of light oil. Most heavy oil is found at the margins of geologic basins and is thought to be the residue of formerly light oil that has lost its light-molecular-weight components through degradation by bacteria, water-washing, and evaporation. Conventional heavy oil and bitumens differ in the degree by which they have been degraded from the original crude oil by bacteria and erosion. Often, bitumen is more viscous than cold molasses and does not flow at ambient conditions. Natural bitumen and extra-heavy oil differ in the degree by which they have been degraded from the original conventional oils by bacteria.

== See also ==
- Mazut – High-sulfur, low-quality heavy fuel oil
- Oil sands – Type of unconventional oil deposit
- Oil shale – Organic-rich fine-grained sedimentary rock containing kerogen
- Steam-assisted gravity drainage – Technology used to produce heavy crude oil and bitumen
- Steam injection (oil industry) – Method of extracting heavy crude oil
