= Canadian Natural Resources =

Canadian hydrocarbon exploration company

Canadian Natural Resources Limited
- Formerly: AEX Minerals Corporation
- Type: Public company
- Traded as: TSX: CNQ; S&P/TSX 60 component
- Industry: Petroleum industry
- Founded: 7 November 1973; 52 years ago
- Headquarters: 2100 Bankers Hall East, 855 2 Street SW, Calgary, Alberta
- Key people: Scott G. Stauth, President; N. Murray Edwards, Chairman; Gordon D. Giffin, director Frank McKenna, director Catherine M. Best, director David A. Tuer, director M. Elizabeth Cannon, director
- Products: Petroleum; Natural gas Natural gas liquids
- Production output: 1,571 thousand barrels of oil equivalent (9,610,000 GJ) per day (2025)
- Revenue: ▲CA$44.167 billion (2025)
- Net income: ▲CA$10.820 billion (2025)
- Total assets: ▲CA$91.830 billion (2025)
- Total equity: ▲CA$44.366 billion (2025)
- Number of employees: 10,750 (2025)
- Website: www.cnrl.com

Canadian Natural Resources Limited, or CNRL or Canadian Natural is a senior Canadian oil and natural gas company that operates primarily in the Western Canadian provinces of British Columbia, Alberta, Saskatchewan, and Manitoba, with offshore operations in the United Kingdom sector of the North Sea, and offshore Côte d'Ivoire and Gabon. The company, which is headquartered in Calgary, Alberta, has the largest undeveloped base in the Western Canadian Sedimentary Basin. It is the largest independent producer of natural gas in Western Canada and the largest producer of heavy crude oil in Canada.

In the 2020 Forbes Global 2000, Canadian Natural Resources was ranked as the 306th-largest public company in the world.

== Overview ==
CBC described CNRL as a "Calgary-based oil and gas giant." CNRL owns and operates Horizon Oil Sands and the Athabasca Oil Sands Project (AOSP) which are about 70 km north of Fort McMurray, Alberta in the Athabasca region. According to a 13 May 2021, Forbes report, CNRL had a market capitalization of $36.6 billion, and sales of $12.6 billion with 9,709 employees.

== Operations ==
As of 31 December 2018, the company had proved reserves of 9.679 billion barrels of oil equivalent (5.921×10^{10} GJ), of which 63% were synthetic crude.

The company also owns two operated pipeline systems, an electricity cogeneration facility, and a 50% interest in the North West Redwater Partnership.

In 2018, the company averaged production of 1,079 thousand barrels of oil equivalent (6,600,000 GJ) per day, of which 76% was petroleum and natural gas liquids and 24% was natural gas. In 2018, production came as follows:

- Synthetic crude from oil sands mining in Northern Alberta – 39% of production.
- Natural gas, primarily produced in Alberta, British Columbia, and Saskatchewan – 24% of production
- Light and medium crude oil and natural gas liquids – 13% of production
- Bitumen – 10% of production
- Primary heavy crude oil – 8% of production
- Pelican Lake heavy crude oil – 6% of production

The company's largest operation is the Horizon Oil Sands project which is 75 kilometres (47 mi) north of Fort McMurray, Alberta. It includes a surface oil sands mining and bitumen extraction plant and bitumen upgrading with associated infrastructure. The company sanctioned the Horizon Oil Sands Project in February 2005 and it began production in early 2009.

== History ==
The company was founded on 7 November 1973, as AEX Minerals Corporation and adopted the present name in 1975.

In 1998, the company sold land to Remington Energy for C$127.5 million.

In 1999, the company and Penn West Petroleum (now Obsidian Energy) acquired the Canadian assets of BP Amoco.

In 2000, the company acquired Ranger Oil for C$1.08 billion.

In 2002, the company acquired Rio Alto for $2.4 billion.

In February 2004, the company acquired Petrovera Resources, a joint venture between Encana and ConocoPhillips.

In September 2006, the company acquired the Canadian operations of Anadarko Petroleum for US$4.1 billion.

In April 2014, the company acquired the conventional assets in Canada of Devon Energy for C$3.125 billion.

In 2017, the company acquired the Canadian oil sands assets of Royal Dutch Shell, including a 70% working interest in the Athabasca Oil Sands Project, for $5.3 billion in cash plus 97,560,975 shares. The shares were sold in 2018.

In August 2018, the company acquired the idled Joslyn oil sands project from Total S.A. and its partners.

In September 2018, the company acquired Laricina Energy for $46 million.

In June 2019, the company acquired the remaining assets in Canada of Devon Energy.

=== Incidents ===
==== Horizon tank farm collapse fatalities ====
In 2007, a tank that was under construction collapsed, killing two workers and seriously injuring two others.

==== Primrose oil seeps ====
In June 2013, the Alberta Energy Regulator investigated reports of leaks in the company's Primrose East oil sands project. The regulator concluded that nearly a million litres of bitumen mixed with water had seeped into the ground around the site.

==== Slave Lake pipeline spill ====
In April 2014, a pipeline owned by the company spilled 70,000 litres of oil and processed water northwest of Slave Lake, Alberta.

==== Red Earth Creek pipeline spill ====
In November 2014, a pipeline owned by the company spilled almost 60,000 litres of crude oil into a muskeg region 27 kilometres from Red Earth Creek, Alberta.

== Leadership ==
=== President ===
1. Dr Aaro Emil Aho, 7 November 1973 – 1 October 1975
2. Herbert Stanley Cornwell, 1 October 1975 – 1976
3. Robert Allen Boulware, 1976–1985
4. John Graham Langille, 1985 – April 2005
5. Stephen Wilson Laut, April 2005 – 28 February 2018
6. Timothy Shawn McKay, 28 February 2018 – 28 February 2024
7. Scott Gerald Stauth, 28 February 2024 – present

=== Chairman of the Board ===
1. Allan Paul Markin, 10 January 1989 – 2 April 2012
2. Norman Murray Edwards, 2 April 2012 – present

== See also ==
- Petroleum industry in Canada
- Environmental issues in Alberta
- Western Canadian Select
- Kirby Lake Aerodrome
