= Petroleum geochemistry =

Petroleum geochemistry is a branch of geochemistry (the application of chemical concepts to understand geological systems) which deals specifically with petroleum and its origin, generation, and accumulation, as well as its extraction, refinement, and use. Petroleum, also known as crude oil, is a solid, liquid, and/or gaesous mix of hydrocarbons. These hydrocarbons are from the burial and metamorphosis of organic matter from millions of years ago; the organic matter is from marine animals, plants, and algae. Petroleum is extracted from the Earth (above or below its surface, depending on the geology of the formation), refined, and used as an energy source.

Crude oil is most commonly organised into four types - light, heavy, sweet, and sour. Petroleum is a non-renewable energy source (also known as a "fossil fuel"), so the efficacy of extraction and refining is important for its continued use; multiple techniques are used to detect and to extract crude oil, based on the source rock it is found in and the type of oil itself.

== Types of petroleum ==
Petroleum is differentiated into types based on its American Petroleum Institute (API) gravity and by how much sulphur it contains.

=== API gravity ===
The API gravity of a crude oil is a measurement of purity - i.e., amount of impurities, such as sulphur, nitrogen, or oxygen. Impurities increase the density of the crude.

==== Light crude oil ====
Light crude oils have higher API gravity figures, due to having fewer impurities. It is more commonly used to produce diesel and gasoline than heavier oils are. Due to its lower viscosity, it is easier to extract and to transport.

==== Heavy crude oil ====
Heavy crude oils have lower API gravity figures, and a larger percentage of impurities. It is used in the making of heavier outputs - e.g., asphalt - and has a higher viscosity, making it more difficult to transport and extract.

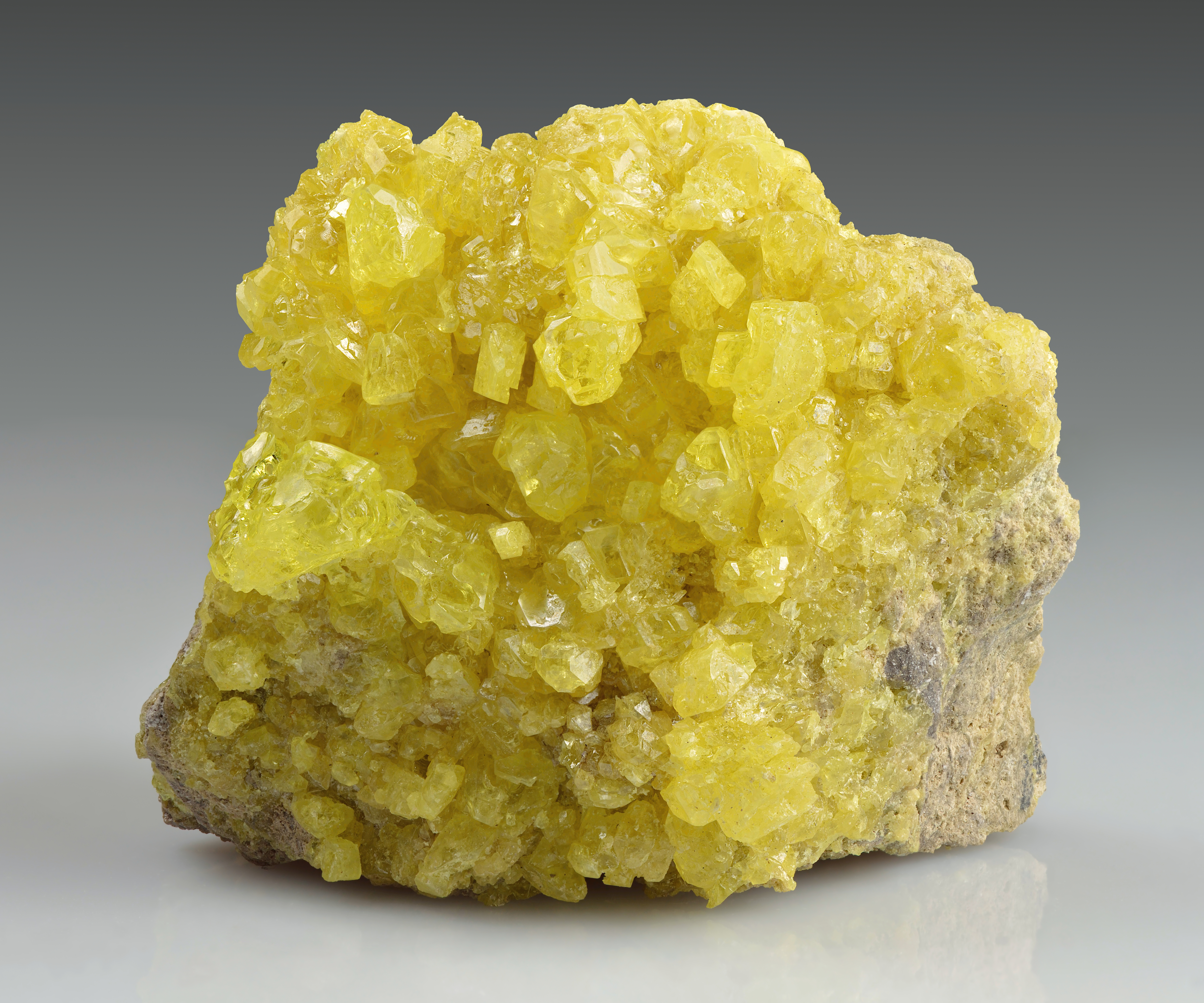
Sulphur, a prevalent constituent of crude oil, and quantity found is used in considering crude oil 'sweet' or 'sour'.

=== Sulphur content ===
How 'sweet' or 'sour' a crude oil is is based on the amount of sulphur it contains.

==== Sweet crude oil ====
Sweet crude oil has lower sulphur content - lower than 0.5%. It can be refined into kerosene, high-quality diesel, and gasoline.

==== Sour crude oil ====
Sour crude oil has high natural sulphur content (at least 0.5%). Extra treatment is required in the refining process; impurities are removed to refine the crude into gasoline. Due to the greater cost associated, it is more commonly refined into fuel oil and diesel - less valuable outputs than products of sweet crude oil.

== Hydrocarbon compounds ==
The three main hydrocarbon compounds in petroleum are paraffins, naphthenes, and aromatics.

=== Paraffins ===
Paraffinic hydrocarbons are part of the alkane series, and are the most common hydrocarbon found in crude oil. Paraffins are often a part of gasoline, making them comparatively more valuable.

Paraffinic hydrocarbons are also known as alkanes, and are represented by the formula C_{n}H_{2n+2}, where n is a positive integer.

=== Naphthenes ===
Naphthenic hydrocarbons are saturated cyclic hydrocarbons, and are very important in the refining of liquid crude oil.

Also known as cyclic alkanes, they are represented by the formula C_{n}H_{2n}, where n is a positive integer.

=== Aromatics ===
Aromatic hydrocarbons are cyclic, and are much less abundant than the other two main hydrocarbon compounds. They are represented by the formula C_{n}H_{n}, where n is a positive integer.

== Petroleum geochemical techniques ==
Techniques are used for finding the source rock (the solid material in which the petroleum is found), as well as the type and amount of the petroleum within. They are also used to note migration timing and pathways, which are then used to predict when and where petroleum can be found; petroleum sources can be predicted if material associated with source rock is found.

=== Surface prospecting ===
Petroleum, or evidence of its immediate occurrence, can be found on the surface of the Earth. Oil seeps can be found near a fault zone, where the movement of Earth's crust can expose petroleum source rock, and thus the crude oil itself. They can also be found on the ocean floor, and can be found using satellite imaging.

=== Distillation ===
While not used as commonly as other techniques today, distillation is used in the process of refining petroleum. It involves the dividation of the crude oil into hydrocarbon categories, and products are recovered from the heated material. A distillation tower is used in separation of the oil, with anywhere between 2 and 300 theoretical plates.

=== Gas chromatography ===
Similar to the process of distillation, gas-liquid chromatography (typically referred to as gas chromatography, or, more simply, GC) utilises a distillation tower to separate the petroleum. However, compared to distillation's 2 to 300 theoretical plates, gas chromatography includes more than 25,000. This provides a greater degree of separation.

In order to achieve more complete analyses, gas chromatography is used along with mass spectrometry (to make gas chromatography/mass spectrometry, or GCMS), with infrared spectrometry (to make gas chromatography/infrared spectrometry, or GCIR), and with isotope ratio mass spectrometry (to make gas chromatography/isotope ratio mass spectrometry, or GSIRMS).

=== Pyrolysis ===
While the crude oil from a petroleum source rock is easily separated using gas chromatography and gas chromatography/mass spectrometry, the organic matter found is not soluble in the solvents used in these techniques, and thus cannot be properly analysed. Pyrolysis is used to characterise kerogens (insoluble hydrocarbons) and asphaltenes (limited solubility in common solvents). There are multiple methods of pyrolysis; fingerprinting methods - which use flash pyrolysis or rapid temperature-programmed pyrolysis - involve rapid transfer of the product to the gas chromatography tower. Rock-Eval is a commonly used process to determine the content of the source rock. Hydrous pyrolysis is performed within water and in high pressures; this method can simulate different depths of burial, demonstrating the possibilities of the fate of the source rock and the associated patroleum.

=== Measurement of stable isotopes ===
The bulk isotope ratio value of stable isotopes for petroleum depict the average isotopic compositions of the oil's components. Carbon stable isotopes are often used in this method. Whether a sample of petroleum originated in a marine environment or a non-marine environment can be seen using this ratio value, as can method distance and age of the oil.

=== Biological markers ===
With credit to the previously listed techniques, biomarkers were found in petroleum and source rock extract. These are fossils from organisms, but are closer in size to molecules than to visible hand samples. They display the same structure as their parent biomolecules and are used in the identification of the organic matter from which the petroleum is derived. Biomarkers are also used in correlating oils and source rocks, finding the oil's maturity, regional differences found between multiple samples, and the history of the basin in which the source rock was located.

=== Correlation ===
Before the use of gas chromatography-mass spectrometry and biomarkers, correlation of locations' geology was used to find how different formations relate to each other and to their environment. Oil-oil correlations (comparing petroleum to other oil found locally or in other areas) and oil-source correlations (comparing petroleum and its source) were performed; infrared spectrometry, refractive indices, solvent extractable organic matter, compound class distribution, and elemental analysis are all methods of doing oil-source correlations.
