= Canadian Crude Index =

Benchmark for oil produced in Canada

The Canadian Crude Oil Index (CCI) serves as a benchmark for oil produced in Canada. It allows investors to track the price, risk, and volatility of the Canadian commodity.

The CCI was launched by Auspice Capital Advisors in 2014. The Index moved from a day end posting to live in January 2016. The CCI can be used to identify opportunities to speculate outright on the price of Canadian crude oil or in conjunction with West Texas Intermediate (WTI) to put on a spread trade which could represent the differential between the two.

Currently, western Canadian oil trades at a discount to WTI. Western Canadian Oil from the Athabasca tar sands is a heavier blend and more difficult to refine. This, as well as its landlocked location and transportation constraints, contribute to the discount. The CCI provides a fixed price reference for Canadian Crude Oil and provides an accessible and transparent index to serve as a benchmark to build investable products upon, and could ultimately increase its demand to global markets. Other heavy sour crudes, like the Mexican Maya blend, currently trade at a premium to WTI.

The CCI targets an exposure that represents a three-month rolling position in crude oil. To create a price representative of Canadian crude the index uses two futures contracts: A fixed price contract, which represents the price of crude oil at Cushing, Oklahoma, and a basis differential contract, which represents the difference in price between Cushing and Canada. Both contracts are priced in U.S. dollars per barrel. Together, these create a fixed price for Canadian crude oil.

The Index value is determined by its third-party calculation and publication agent, the NYSE Global Index Group, based on daily returns of prices published by ICE Futures Europe.
