= Tapis crude =

Malaysian crude oil

Tapis crude is a Malaysian crude oil used as a pricing benchmark in Singapore. Tapis is very light, with an API gravity of 43°-45°, and very sweet, with only about 0.04% sulfur. While it is not traded on a market like Brent Crude or West Texas Intermediate (WTI), it is often used as an oil marker or price referencing indicator for Asia and Australia.

The price of Tapis in Singapore is often considerably higher than the price of benchmark crude oils such as Brent or West Texas Intermediate (WTI), the more commonly referenced in market commentaries. This is because its lightness (i.e. higher ° API) allows for greater production of higher-value products, such as petrol, than from Brent or WTI. Its high price is also due to the purity of the blend. Its extremely low sulfur content means it requires less refinery processing than sourer crude oils, and hence a lower processing cost.

The Tapis field, located off the coast of Terengganu in the South China Sea was discovered in 1969 with production starting in 1978. ExxonMobil holds a 30% stake, the rest being held by state-owned Petronas. As of 2018, production is approximately 300,000 barrels per day.

== See also ==
- Mean of Platts Singapore, similar regional oil price benchmark
