= Sweet oil =

Sweet oil may refer to:

- Another name for olive oil
- Sweet crude oil, a type of petroleum
- Mild vegetable oil used for food
