= Tapis =

Tapis may refer to:

- Tapis (Philippine clothing), a piece of cloth worn as garment or the act of putting this on
- Tapis (Indonesian weaving style), a traditional style of weaving
- Tapis crude, a crude oil from Malaysia
- Esteban Tapis (1754-1825), Spanish missionary
- On the tapis, a Victorian phrase meaning 'on the table' or 'under consideration' (tapis = tablecloth (fr.))
