= Light crude oil =

Low density liquid petroleum

Light crude oil is a low-density, liquid petroleum that freely flows in standard conditions (room temperature), has a low viscosity, a low specific gravity, and a high API gravity, because of the high proportion of light hydrocarbon fractions. Commercially, light crude oil sells for a higher price of petroleum than does heavy crude oil, because the fractional distillation of light crude oil produces greater percentages of gasoline and diesel fuel per unit of petroleum.

== Varying standards ==
The commercial definitions of the terms light crude oil and heavy crude oil are established by the New York Mercantile Exchange (NYMEX): American light crude oil has an API gravity between 37° API (840 kg/m^{3}) and 42° API (816 kg/m^{3}); and foreign light crude oil has an API gravity between 32° API (865 kg/m^{3}) and 42° API (816 kg/m^{3}). In Canada, the National Energy Board defines light crude oil as having a density less than 875.7 kg/m^{3} (API gravity greater than 30.1° API). whereas the government of Alberta defines light crude oil as a petroleum with a density of less than 850 kg/m^{3} (API gravity greater than 35° API) In México, the national petroleum company, Pemex, defines light crude oil having a density between 27° API (893 kg/m^{3}) and 38° API (835 kg/m^{3}).

== Examples of light crude oils ==
A wide variety of benchmark crude oils worldwide are considered to be light. The most prominent in North America is West Texas Intermediate which has an API gravity of 39.6° API (827 kg/m^{3}). It is often referred to by publications when quoting oil prices. The most commonly referenced benchmark oil from Europe is Brent Crude, which is 38.06° API (835 kg/m^{3}). The third most commonly quoted benchmark is Dubai Crude, which is 31° API (871 kg/m^{3}). This is considered light by Arabian standards but would not be considered light if produced in the U.S.

The largest oil field in the world, Saudi Arabia's Ghawar field, produces light crude oils ranging from 33° API (860 kg/m^{3}) to 40° API (825 kg/m^{3})

== U.S. price ==
In the United States, the price of the front month light sweet crude oil futures contract, traded on the NYMEX commodity exchange (symbol CL), is widely reported as a proxy for the cost of imported crude oil. These contracts have delivery dates in all 12 months of the year. From below $20 a barrel in early 2002, it rose to an intraday peak of $70.85 at the end of August 2005 in the aftermath of Hurricane Katrina. A new intraday record high of $78.40 was set on July 14, 2006, prompted by the firing of at least six missiles by North Korea on July 4–5, 2006, and escalating Middle East violence.

Subsequently, the price declined until on October 11, 2006, the price closed at $66.04. But, by August 2007, the price had reached a record high of $78.71, amid production output concerns in the North Sea and Nigeria. On November 29, 2007, the price peaked at $98.70 intraday after closing at $98.03 the previous day. The price of light crude set a new intraday high on May 21, 2008, of $133.45 and closed at $133.17. A new high was reached on July 11, 2008, as prices temporarily reached $147.27 a barrel.

=== Trading ===
Light crude oil is traded on the CME Globex, CME ClearPort, (CME Group) and Open Outcry (New York) futures exchange venues and is quoted in U.S. dollars and cents per barrel. Its product symbol is "CL" and its contract size is 1,000 barrels (160 m^{3}) with a minimum fluctuation of $0.01 per barrel.

== See also ==
- Benchmark (crude oil)
- Brent Crude
- West Texas Intermediate
- Sweet crude oil
- Price of petroleum
