= Upstream price =

An upstream price is the price of one of the main inputs of production (for processing/manufacturing etc.) or a price quoted on higher market levels (e.g. wholesale markets).

Upstream prices are the prices paid by producers (as opposed to consumers), and are directly related to the cost of production. They comprise input prices, or the prices a manufacturer pays to the supplier of raw material, as well as output prices, or the prices a retailer pays to the manufacturer. In contrast, downstream prices are the prices paid by consumers at the retail level.

The relationship between upstream prices and downstream prices is largely explained by asymmetric price transmission.
