= Benchmark (crude oil) =

Reference price for trading of an oil commodity

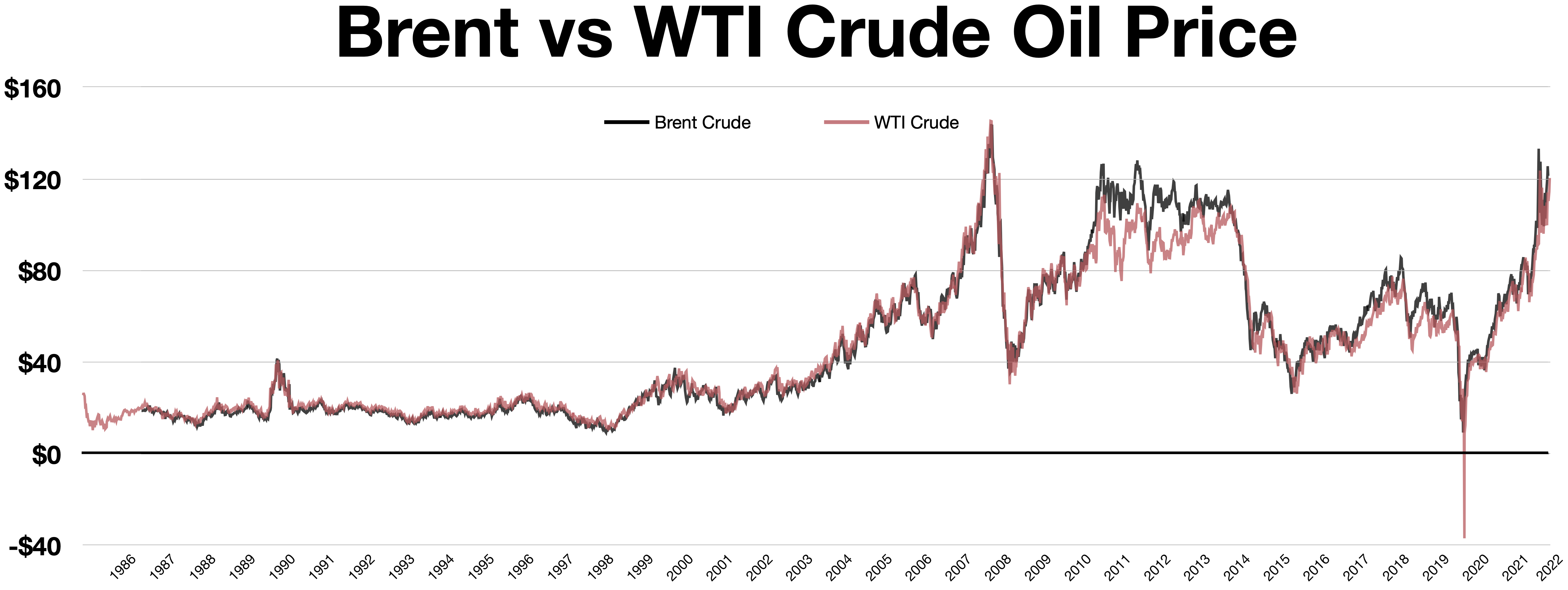
Brent Crude West Texas Intermediate

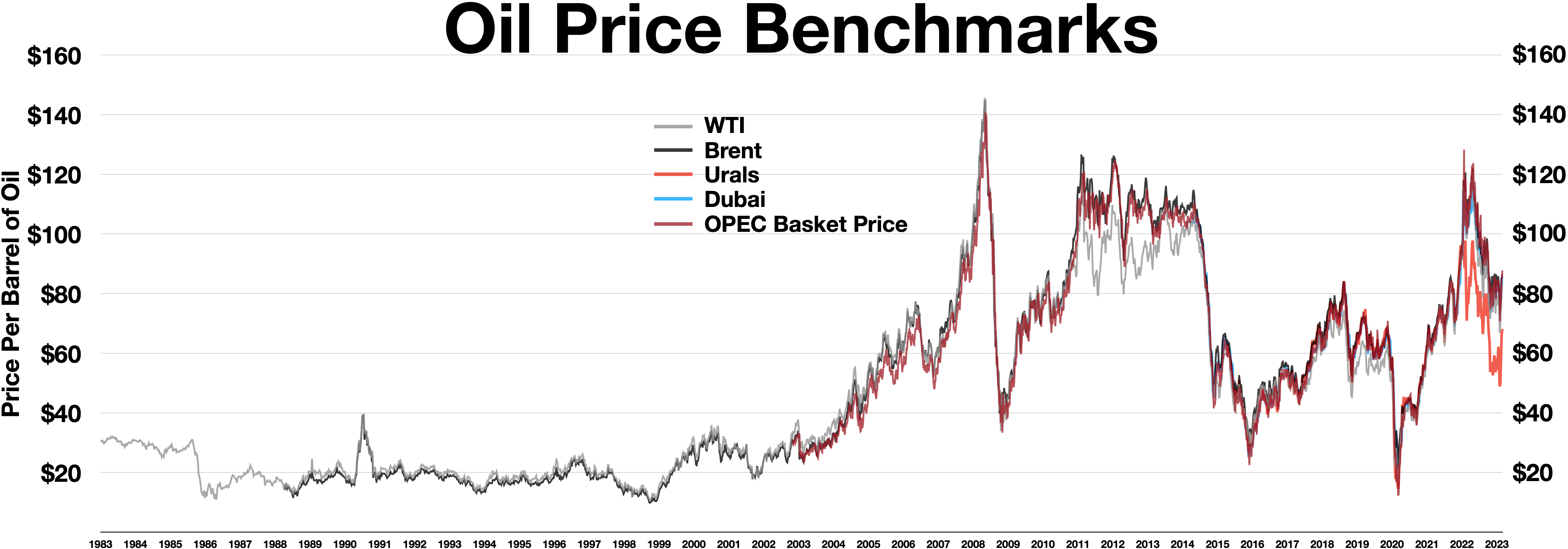
West Texas Intermediate Brent Crude Urals oil (Russian export mix) Dubai Crude OPEC Basket Price

A benchmark crude or marker crude is a crude oil that serves as a reference price for buyers and sellers of crude oil. There are three primary benchmarks, West Texas Intermediate (WTI), Brent Blend, and Dubai Crude. Other well-known blends include the OPEC Reference Basket used by OPEC, Tapis Crude which is traded in Singapore, Western Canadian Select used in Canada, Bonny Light used in Nigeria, Urals oil used in Russia and Mexico's Isthmus. Energy Intelligence Group publishes a handbook which identified 195 major crude streams or blends in its 2011 edition.

Benchmarks are used because there are many different varieties and grades of crude oil. Using benchmarks makes referencing types of oil easier for sellers and buyers.

There is always a spread between WTI, Brent and other blends due to the relative volatility (high API gravity is more valuable), sweetness/sourness (low sulfur is more valuable) and transportation cost. This is the price that controls world oil market price.

== West Texas Intermediate (WTI) ==
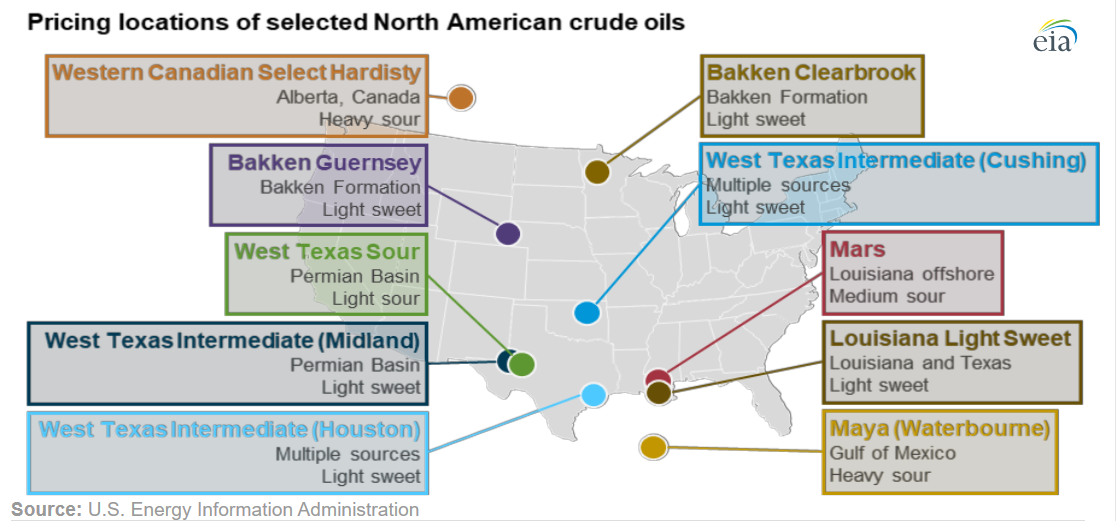
West Texas Intermediate (light blue) alongside other selected North American oil benchmarks

West Texas Intermediate is used primarily in the U.S. It is light (API gravity) and sweet (low-sulfur) thus making it ideal for producing products like low-sulfur gasoline and low-sulfur diesel. Brent is not as light or as sweet as WTI but it is still a high-grade crude. The OPEC basket is slightly heavier and more sour than Brent. As a result of these gravity and sulfur differences, (at least before 2011) WTI is typically traded at a dollar or two premium to Brent and another dollar or two premium to the OPEC basket. Since 2011, WTI has traded at lower prices than Brent.

== Brent Blend ==
Brent Crude is a blend of crude oil from fields in the North Sea, including Brent, Forties, Oseberg, Ekofisk, and Troll (BFOET). It is assessed daily as Dated Brent, which prices cargoes loading 10–30 days ahead, serving as the settlement reference for over 70% of global seaborne crude trades.

== Dubai and Oman ==
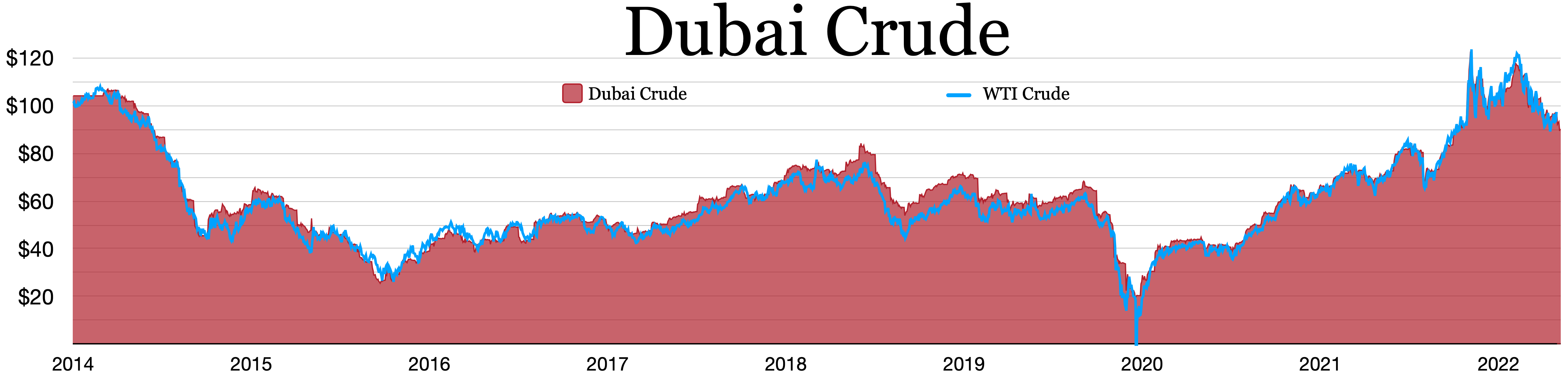
Dubai crude oil in USD per barrel Dubai crude WTI Crude

Dubai Crude, also known as Fateh, is a heavy sour crude oil extracted from Dubai. It is produced in the Emirate of Dubai, part of the United Arab Emirates. Dubai's only refinery, at Jebel Ali, takes condensates as feedstocks, and therefore all of Dubai's crude production is exported. For many years it was the only freely traded oil in the Middle East, but gradually a spot market has developed in Omani crude as well.

For many years, most of the oil producers in the Middle East have taken the monthly spot price average of Dubai and Oman as the benchmark for sales to the Far East (WTI and Brent futures prices are used for exports to the Atlantic Basin). In July 2007, a potential new mechanism arose in the form of the Dubai Mercantile Exchange, which offers futures contracts in Omani crude. Whether the DME will be successful, and whether Omani futures prices will be adopted by producers and buyers as a benchmark, remain to be seen.

== Canadian Crude ==
Edmonton Par and Western Canadian Select (WCS) "are benchmarks [sic] crude oils for the Canadian market. Both Edmonton Par and WCS are high-quality low sulphur crude oils with API gravity levels of around 40°. In contrast, WCS is a heavy crude oil with an API gravity level of 20.5°."

The Canadian Crude Index (CCI) serves as a benchmark for oil produced in Canada. It allows investors to track the price, risk and volatility of the Canadian commodity. The CCI provides a fixed price reference for Canadian crude oil and provides an accessible and transparent index to serve as a benchmark to build investable products upon, and could ultimately increase its demand to global markets.

== Contracts ==
Because of its excellent liquidity and price transparency, the contract is used as a principal international pricing benchmark.

The first futures contracts on crude oil were traded in 1983, with the Chicago Board of Trade (CBOT) and the New York Mercantile Exchange (Nymex) both attempting to take advantage of the government's de-regulation of crude oil. CBOT's initial contracts had delivery problems, so customers abandoned it for Nymex.

Crude oil became the world's most actively traded commodity, with the NYMEX Division light sweet crude oil futures contract becoming the world's most liquid form for crude oil trading, as well as the world's largest-volume futures contract trading on a physical commodity. Additional risk management and trading opportunities are offered through options on the futures contract; calendar spread options; crack spread options on the pricing differential of heating oil futures and crude oil futures and gasoline futures and crude oil futures; and average price options.

The contract trades in units of 1,000 barrels, and the delivery point is Cushing, Oklahoma, which is also accessible to the international spot markets via pipelines. The contract provides for delivery of several grades of domestic and internationally traded foreign crudes, and serves the diverse needs of the physical market.

== See also ==
- Argus Sour Crude Index (ASCI)
- Gasoline and diesel usage and pricing
- Petroleum industry
- Price of oil
