= OPEC Reference Basket =

Weighted average benchmark of crude oil prices from OPEC members

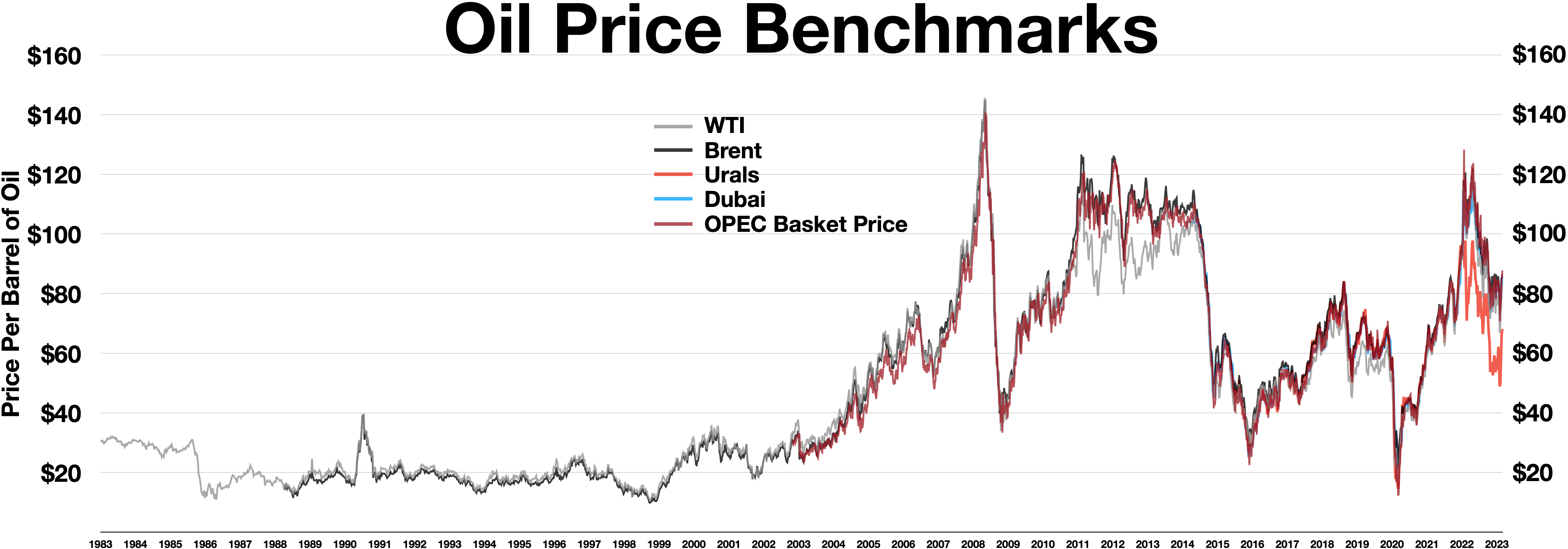
West Texas Intermediate Brent Crude Urals oil (Russian export mix) Dubai Crude OPEC Basket Price

The OPEC Reference Basket (ORB), also referred to as the OPEC Basket, is a weighted average of prices for petroleum blends produced by OPEC members. It is used as an important benchmark for crude oil prices. OPEC has often attempted to keep the price of the OPEC Basket between upper and lower limits, by increasing and decreasing production. This makes the measure important for market analysts. The OPEC Basket, including a mix of light and heavy crude oil products, is heavier than both Brent crude oil, and West Texas Intermediate crude oil.

Since January 1, 2017, the OPEC reference basket consists of a weighted average of the following crudes:

- Saharan Blend (from Algeria)
- Girassol (from Angola)
- Oriente (from Ecuador)
- Rabi Light (from Gabon)
- Iran Heavy (from Iran)
- Basra Light (from Iraq)
- Kuwait Export (from Kuwait)
- Es Sider (from Libya)
- Bonny Light (from Nigeria)
- Qatar Marine (from Qatar)
- Arab Light (from Saudi Arabia)
- Murban (from UAE)
- Merey (from Venezuela)

== Old line-up ==
Prior to June 16, 2005, the OPEC Basket did not include petroleum blends from all OPEC members. The earlier basket consisted of seven crudes:

- Saharan Blend (from Algeria)
- Minas (from Indonesia)
- Isthmus (from Mexico, a non-OPEC country)
- Bonny Light (from Nigeria)
- Arab Light (from Saudi Arabia)
- Fateh (from Dubai, UAE)
- Tia Juana Light (from Venezuela)
