= Isthmus-34 Light =

Sour crude oil produced in Mexico

Isthmus-34 Light is a sour crude oil produced in Mexico mainly in the Campeche zone, in the Gulf of Mexico along with the extraction centers in Chiapas, Tabasco, and Veracruz. The name derives from the nearby Isthmus of Tehuantepec. Before 2017, the oil was a component of the OPEC Reference Basket (despite Mexico's not being a part of OPEC). It has the following characteristics:

Properties	Isthmus
Density (20 °C)	0.8535 g/cm^{3}
API gravity	33.74 °API
Viscosity
60 °F (15.6 °C)	65.6 Saybolt Universal Seconds (SUS)
70 °F (21.1 °C)	57.8 SUS
77 °F (25.0 °C)	54.5 SUS
Sulphur total, weight %	1.45
Oils, weight %	89.2
Alkanes, weight %	8.1

== See also ==
- Cantarell Field
