= Dubai Crude =

Medium sour crude oil

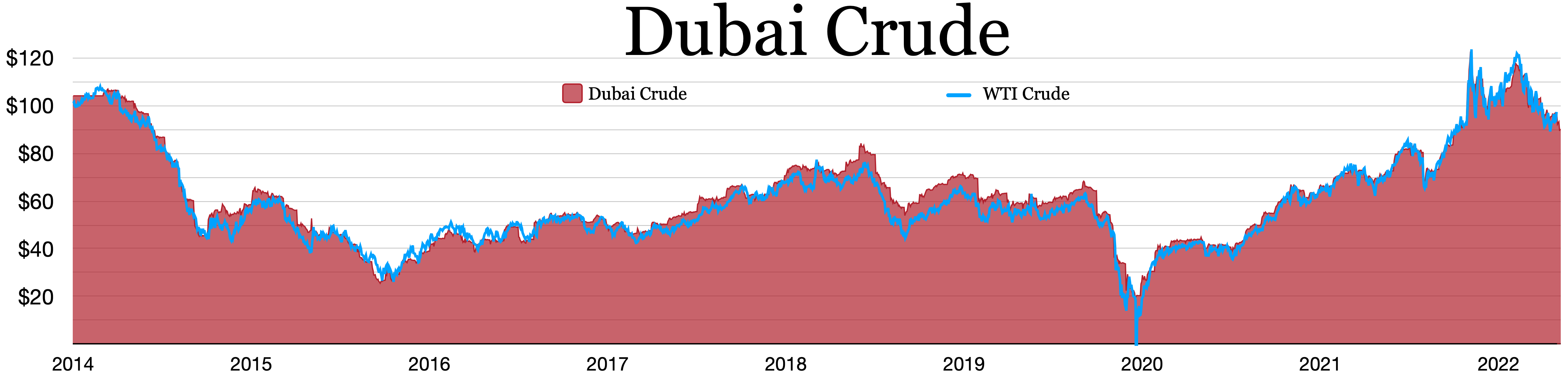
Dubai crude oil in USD per barrel Dubai crude WTI Crude

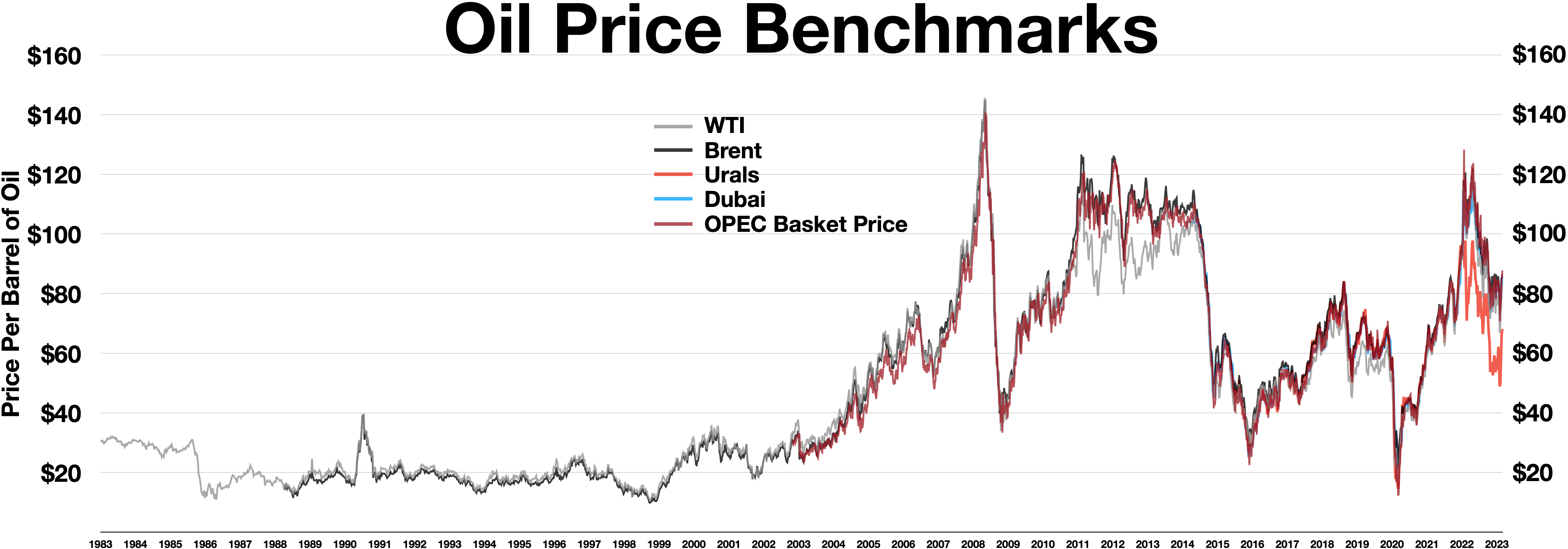
West Texas Intermediate Brent Crude Urals oil (Russian export mix) Dubai Crude OPEC Reference Basket

Dubai Crude is a medium sour crude oil extracted from Dubai. Dubai Crude is used as a price benchmark or oil marker because it is one of only a few Persian Gulf crude oils available immediately. There are two other main oil markers: Brent Crude and West Texas Intermediate.

Dubai Crude is generally used for pricing Persian Gulf crude oil exports to Asia. The Dubai benchmark is also known as Fateh, used in the United Arab Emirates. Forward trade of Dubai Crude is limited to one or two months.

Dubai Crude is a medium oil. It has a gravity of 31° API (specific gravity of 0.871) and a sulfur content of 2%/weight.

== See also ==
- DME Oman Crude Oil Futures Contract
- List of crude oil products
- Petroeuro
- Benchmark (crude oil)
