= Asymmetric price transmission =

Process in economics

Asymmetric price transmission (sometimes abbreviated as APT and informally called "rockets and feathers", also known as asymmetric cost pass-through) refers to a pricing phenomenon occurring when downstream prices react in a different manner to upstream price changes. The simplest example is when prices of finished products increase promptly whenever prices of inputs increase, but take time to decrease after input price decreases.

== Introduction ==
Price transmission is defined as the process by which price changes at one level of a supply chain are passed through to another level. Most commonly, it describes how quickly and to what extent changes in upstream prices (such as raw materials, production inputs, or wholesale prices) affect downstream prices (such as the final retail prices paid by consumers).

Upstream and downstream prices are fundamentally related. In the absence of external shocks, an economic equilibrium relationship between the two should exist. External shocks to the system (i.e., sudden changes to downstream or upstream prices) should trigger short- and long-run adjustments toward this equilibrium, as rational economic agents price their goods to maximize their constant utility function. Conversely, in the long run, the prices of goods should reflect their underlying scarcity.

The concept is known colloquially as "rocket and feather pricing" or "rockets and feathers", an analogy which describes the price rising rapidly like a rocket, but falling slowly like a feather.

== Examples ==
=== Commodities ===
Assume that the commodities analysed are crude oil (global upstream) and petroleum (local downstream). The market for petroleum is "small" compared to the market for crude oil in terms of quantities sold / bought, so that downstream prices cannot drive upstream prices. Further assume that, in the short run, only crude oil prices drive petroleum prices (i.e., prices of other inputs are assumed to be constant), and that no substitutes to petroleum are available in the short run.

Given the above, we might expect that (1) increases and decreases in crude oil prices trigger appropriate changes downstream, and (2) resulting changes are symmetric in terms of absolute size / timing. Such behaviour, predicted by all canonical industry / market pricing models (perfect competition, monopoly) is called symmetric price transmission.

In contrast to symmetric price transmission, asymmetric price transmission is said to exist when the adjustment of prices is not homogeneous with respect to characteristics external or internal to the system. As an example of asymmetric price transmission consider a situation in which increases in crude oil prices lead to immediate increases in petroleum prices, but decreases in crude oil prices take time to be passed down to petroleum prices. This asymmetry is referred to as time asymmetry, or a combination of time and size asymmetry, that is, a situation when increases in crude oil prices lead to more significant changes (in absolute values) in petroleum prices than decreases.

=== Fiscal policy ===
Asymmetric price transmission also occurs in the context of fiscal policy changes. For example, when taxes are cut, businesses tend to retain the savings to improve their profit margins, but if the tax is raised back to its original level years later, prices surged significantly higher than they were before the cut.

== Consequences ==
The issue of asymmetric price transmission has received a considerable amount of attention in economic literature for two reasons.

Firstly, its presence is not in line with predictions of the canonical economic theory (e.g. perfect competition and monopoly), which expect that under some regularity assumptions (such as non-kinked, convex/concave demand function) downstream responses to upstream changes should be symmetric in terms of absolute size and timing.

Secondly, because of the size of the some markets in which asymmetric price transmission takes place (such as petroleum markets), global dependence on some products (again oil) and the share of income spent by average household on some products (again petroleum products), asymmetric price transmission is important from the welfare point of view. One must remember that APT implies a welfare redistribution from agents downstream to agents upstream (presumably consumers to large energy companies); it has serious political and social consequences.
