= Argus Sour Crude Index =

Pricing tool for crude oil

The Argus Sour Crude Index (ASCI) is a pricing tool used by buyers, sellers and traders of imported crude oil for use in long-term contracts.

The ASCI methodology creates a single daily volume-weighted average price index of aggregate deals done for three component crude grades as if they were one grade of crude oil.

The three crude oil grade components are Mars, Poseidon, and Southern Green Canyon.

Thus the daily ASCI price published by Argus Media Ltd represents the value of US Gulf coast medium sour crude oil.

== Market adoption ==
The Argus Sour Crude Index (“ASCI”) has been adopted as the benchmark price for sales of crude oil by Saudi Aramco (in 2009), Kuwait (in 2009) and Iraq (in 2010).

Contracts based upon ASCI are listed on the world's two largest oil exchanges, the CME Group New York Mercantile Exchange (NYMEX) and the Intercontinental Exchange (ICE).
