= Urals oil =

Brand of Russian heavy oil

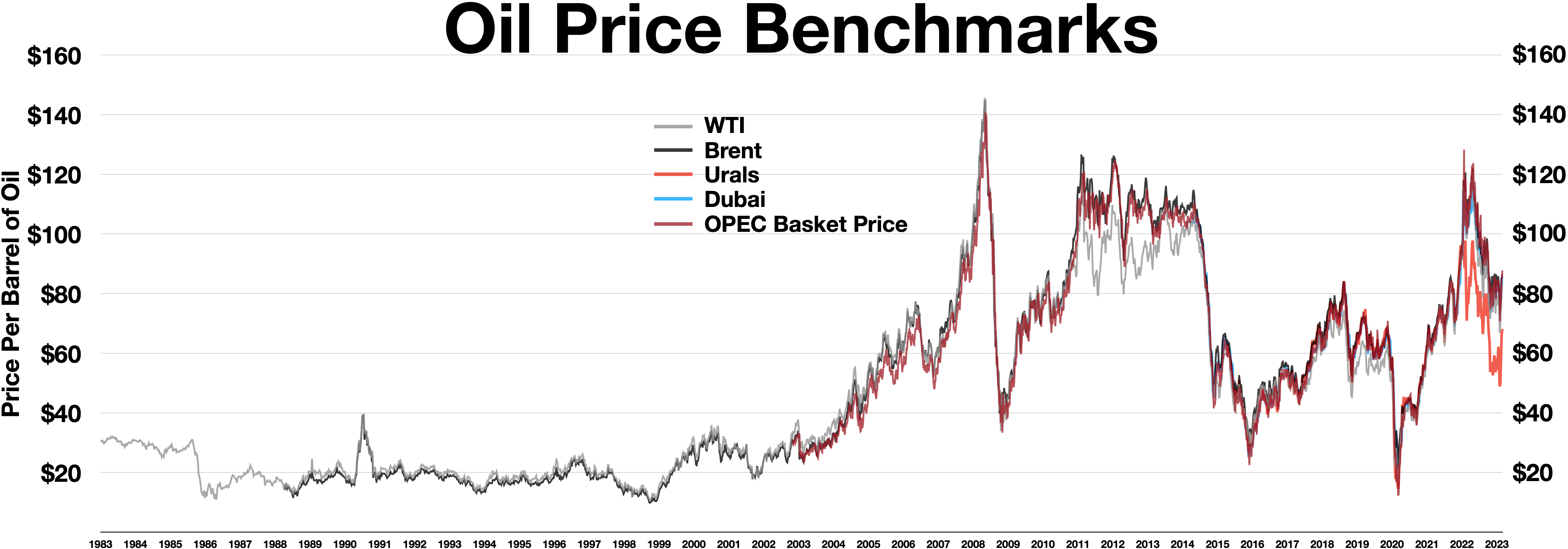
West Texas Intermediate Brent Crude Urals oil Dubai Crude OPEC Basket Price

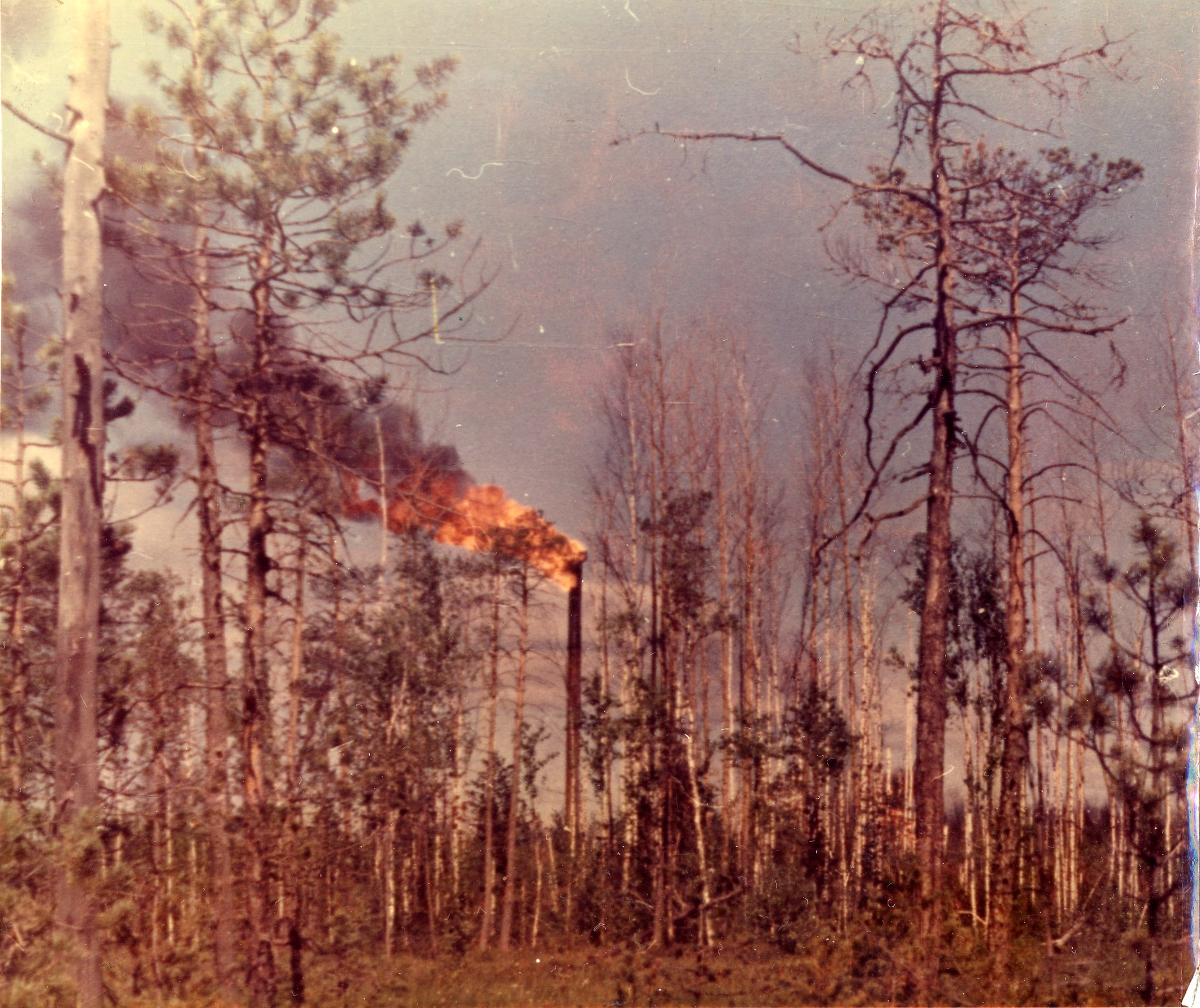
Associated petroleum gas being burnt in a gas flare in the taiga of West Siberia, early 1980s

Urals oil is a reference oil brand used as a basis for pricing of the Russian export oil mixture. It is a mix of heavy sour oil of the Urals and the Volga region with light oil of Western Siberia. Other reference oils are Brent, West Texas Intermediate and Dubai.

Urals brand oil is supplied through the Baku-Novorossiysk pipeline system and the Druzhba pipeline. Urals oil futures trade on Moscow Exchange. There was also an effort to trade it on NYMEX under the name of REBCO (Russian Export Blend Crude Oil).

Urals grade oil was traded in Northwestern Europe on June 25, 2020, at a premium to Brent of $2.35/bbl – a record in the entire history of monitoring since September 1994. Since the 2022 Russian invasion of Ukraine, the price of Urals oil has dipped to $15–20 under the price of Brent.
