= Sweet crude oil =

Type of petroleum

Sweet crude oil is a type of petroleum. The New York Mercantile Exchange designates petroleum with less than 0.5% sulfur as sweet.

Petroleum containing higher levels of sulfur is called sour crude oil.

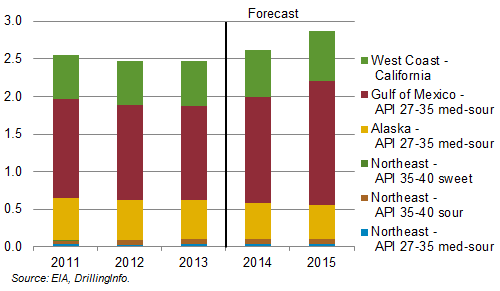
In the Annual Energy Outlook crude type estimates, all Alaska and Gulf of Mexico oil production is assumed to be API gravity 27-35 degrees and medium sour. Northeast crude oil production consists of approximately 30% API 27-35 medium-sour and 60% API 35-40 sour. The residual production is API 35-40 sweet. West Coast region production, coming from California, is primarily API<27 sour. Per the "Regions and crude types" discussion above, California production is categorized by its own crude type.

Sweet crude oil contains small amounts of hydrogen sulfide and carbon dioxide. High-quality, low-sulfur crude oil is commonly used for processing into gasoline and is in high demand, particularly in industrialized nations. Light sweet crude oil is the most sought-after version of crude oil as it contains a disproportionately large fraction that is directly processed (fractionation) into gasoline (naphtha), kerosene, and high-quality diesel (gas oil).

The term sweet originates from the fact that a low level of sulfur provides the oil with a relatively sweet taste and pleasant smell, compared to sulfurous oil. Nineteenth-century prospectors would taste and smell small quantities of oil to determine its quality.

== Producers ==
This list is derived from standard industry assays:

- Africa:
  - Angola: CLOV (API 32.0°, sulfur 0.26%), Girassol (API 29.9°, sulfur 0.33%), Mondo Blend (API 27.9°, sulfur 0.48%), Pazflor (API 24.6°, sulfur 0.40%), Saxi Batuque (API 35.3°, sulfur 0.23%)
  - Chad: Doba (API 21.1°, sulfur 0.10%)
  - Equatorial Guinea: Zafiro Blend (API 30.2°, sulfur 0.26%)
  - Mozambique: Coral Condensate (API 52.7°, sulfur 0.01%)
  - Nigeria: Bonga (API 27.7°, sulfur 0.26%), Ebok (API 17.9°, sulfur 0.44%), Erha (API 35.1°, sulfur 0.18%), Qua Iboe (API 37.3°, sulfur 0.12%), Usan (API 27.4°, sulfur 0.29%), Yoho (API 41.0°, sulfur 0.06%)
- Asia Pacific:
  - Australia: Gippsland Condensate (API 68.4°, sulfur 0.01%), Gorgon (API 53.4°, sulfur 0.02%)
  - Indonesia: Banyu Urip (API 32.8°, sulfur 0.32%)
  - Malaysia: Tapis (API 45.8°, sulfur 0.03%), Terengganu (API 73.1°, sulfur 0.00%)
  - Papua New Guinea: Kutubu (API 52.5°, sulfur 0.02%)
- Middle East/Central Asia:
  - Azerbaijan: Azeri BTC (API 39.0°, sulfur 0.16%), Azeri Light (API 35.6°, sulfur 0.19%)
- The North Sea:
    - Norway
    - United Kingdom (Brent Crude)
- North America:
  - United States: Bakken (API 43.8°, sulfur 0.09%), Domestic Sweet (API 42.9°, sulfur 0.43%), WTI Light (API 47.5°, sulfur 0.05%)
- South America:
  - Guyana: Golden Arrowhead (API 36.5°, sulfur 0.25%), Unity Gold (API 33.9°, sulfur 0.41%)

== Pricing ==
The term "price of oil", as used in the U.S. media, generally means the cost per barrel (42 U.S. gallons) of West Texas Intermediate Crude, to be delivered to Cushing, Oklahoma, during the upcoming month. This information is available from NYMEX or the U.S. Energy Information Administration.

== See also ==
- Petroleum Classification
  - Light crude oil
  - Sour crude oil
  - Mazut
- List of crude oil products
- Oil price increases since 2003
