= Sour crude oil =

Crude oil with sulfur impurities

Sour crude oil is crude oil containing more than 0.5% sulfur impurities (by weight). The impurities need to be removed before this lower-quality crude can be refined into petrol, thereby increasing the cost of processing. This results in a higher-priced gasoline than that made from sweet crude oil.

Current environmental regulations in the United States strictly limit the sulfur content in refined fuels such as diesel and gasoline.

The majority of the sulfur in crude oil occurs bonded to carbon atoms, with a small amount occurring as elemental sulfur in solution and as hydrogen sulfide gas. Sour oil can be toxic and corrosive, especially when the oil contains higher levels of hydrogen sulfide, which is a breathing hazard. At low concentrations the gas gives the oil the smell of rotting eggs. For safety reasons, sour crude oil needs to be stabilized by having hydrogen sulfide gas (H_{2}S) removed from it before being transported by oil tankers.

Since sour crude is more common than sweet crude in the U.S. part of the Gulf of Mexico, Platts has come out in March 2009 with a new sour crude benchmark (oil marker) called "Americas Crude Marker (ACM)". Dubai Crude and Oman Crude, both sour crude oils, have been used as a benchmark for Middle East crude oils for some time.

The major producers of sour crude oil include:

- North America: Alberta (Canada), United States' portion of the Gulf of Mexico, Alaska and Mexico
- South America: Venezuela, Colombia, and Ecuador
- Middle East: Saudi Arabia, Iraq, Kuwait, Iran, Syria, and Egypt
- Europe: Russian Volga region and the Urals

== See also ==
- Heavy crude oil – Highly-viscous oil that cannot easily flow to production wells under normal reservoir conditions
- Sour gas – Term for gas with significant amounts of hydrogen sulfide
- Sweet crude oil – Type of petroleum
