= Petroleum =

Naturally occurring combustible liquid

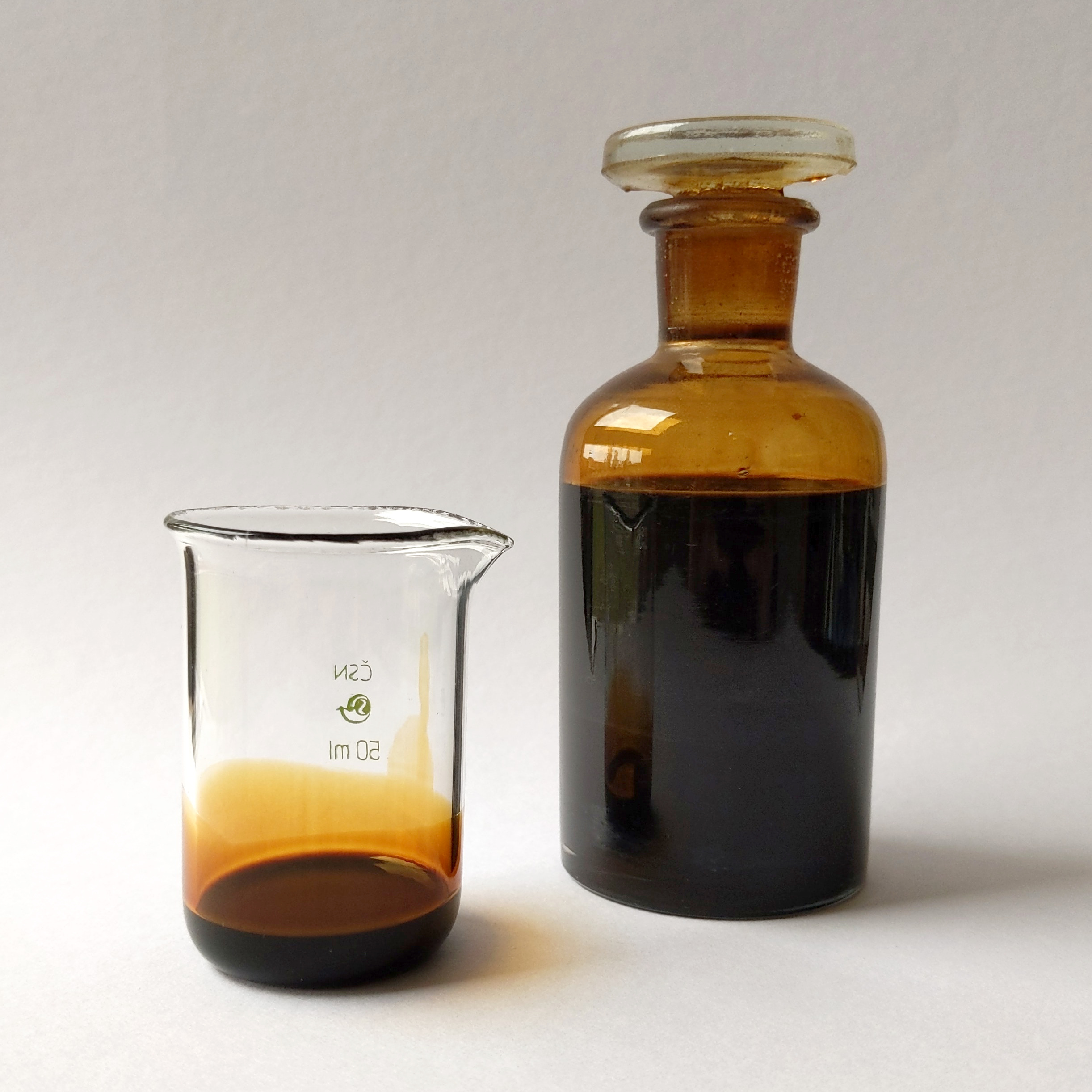
A sample of petroleum

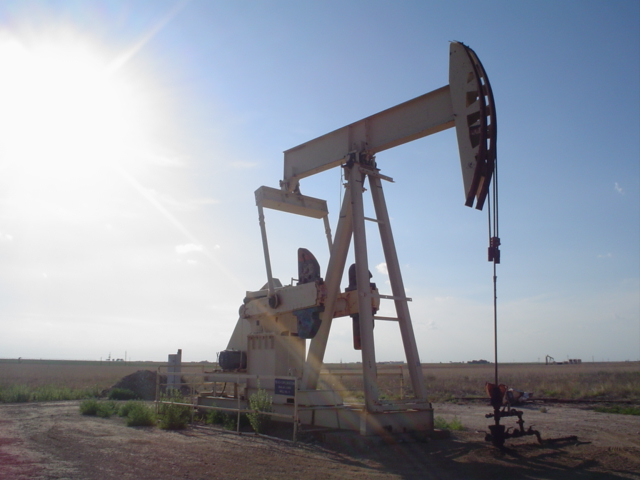
Pumpjack pumping an oil well near Lubbock, Texas, U.S.

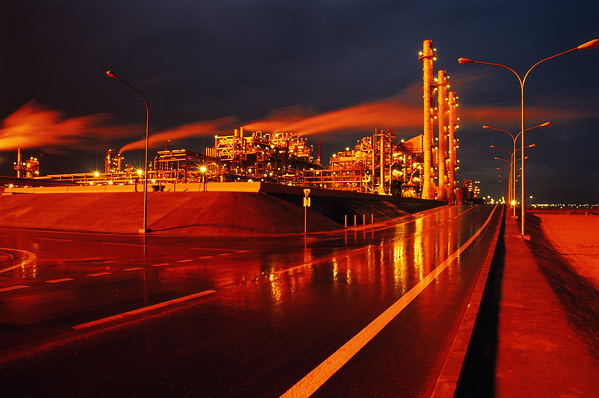
An oil refinery in Ahmadi Governorate in Kuwait

Petroleum, also known as crude oil or simply oil, is a natural resource that appears as a yellowish-black liquid chemical mixture found in geological formations, consisting primarily of hydrocarbons. The term petroleum refers to both naturally occurring unprocessed crude oil, as well as to petroleum products that consist of refined crude oil.

Petroleum is a fossil fuel formed over millions of years from anaerobic decay of organic materials from buried prehistoric organisms, particularly plankton and algae. It is estimated that 70% of the world's oil deposits were formed during the Mesozoic, 20% were formed in the Cenozoic, and only 10% were formed in the Paleozoic. Conventional reserves of petroleum are primarily recovered by drilling, which is performed after studying the relevant structural geology, analysis of the sedimentary basin, and characterization of the petroleum reservoir. There are also unconventional reserves such as oil sands and oil shale which are recovered using methods such as fracking.

Once extracted, oil is refined and separated, most easily by distillation, into numerous products for direct use or use in manufacturing. Petroleum products include fuels such as gasoline (petrol), diesel, kerosene and jet fuel; bitumen, paraffin wax and lubricants; reagents used to make plastics; solvents, textiles, refrigerants, paint, synthetic rubber, fertilizers, pesticides, pharmaceuticals, and thousands of other petrochemicals. Petroleum is used to manufacture a wide variety of materials essential for modern life, and it is estimated that the world consumes about 100 million barrels (16 million cubic metres) each day. Petroleum production played a key role in industrialization and economic development, especially after the Second Industrial Revolution. Some petroleum-rich countries, known as petrostates, gained significant economic and international influence during the latter half of the 20th century due to their control of oil production and trade.

Petroleum is a non-renewable natural resource, and its exploitation is damaging to the natural environment, climate system and human health. Extraction, refining and burning of petroleum fuels counteract carbon sinks by releasing large quantities of greenhouse gases back into the Earth's atmosphere, making petroleum one of the major contributors to anthropogenic climate change. Other negative environmental effects, at almost all stages of use, include direct release—such as oil spills—and secondary pollution of air and water sources.

Proximity to petroleum deposits, and subsequent access to and pricing of oil have historically fueled both domestic and geopolitical conflicts, state-sanctioned oil wars, diplomatic and trade frictions, energy policy disputes and other resource conflicts. While production is estimated to reach peak oil before 2035, global economic focus on climate change mitigation in the transition to renewable energy sources and increased electrification will greatly reduce dependency on petroleum.

== Etymology ==
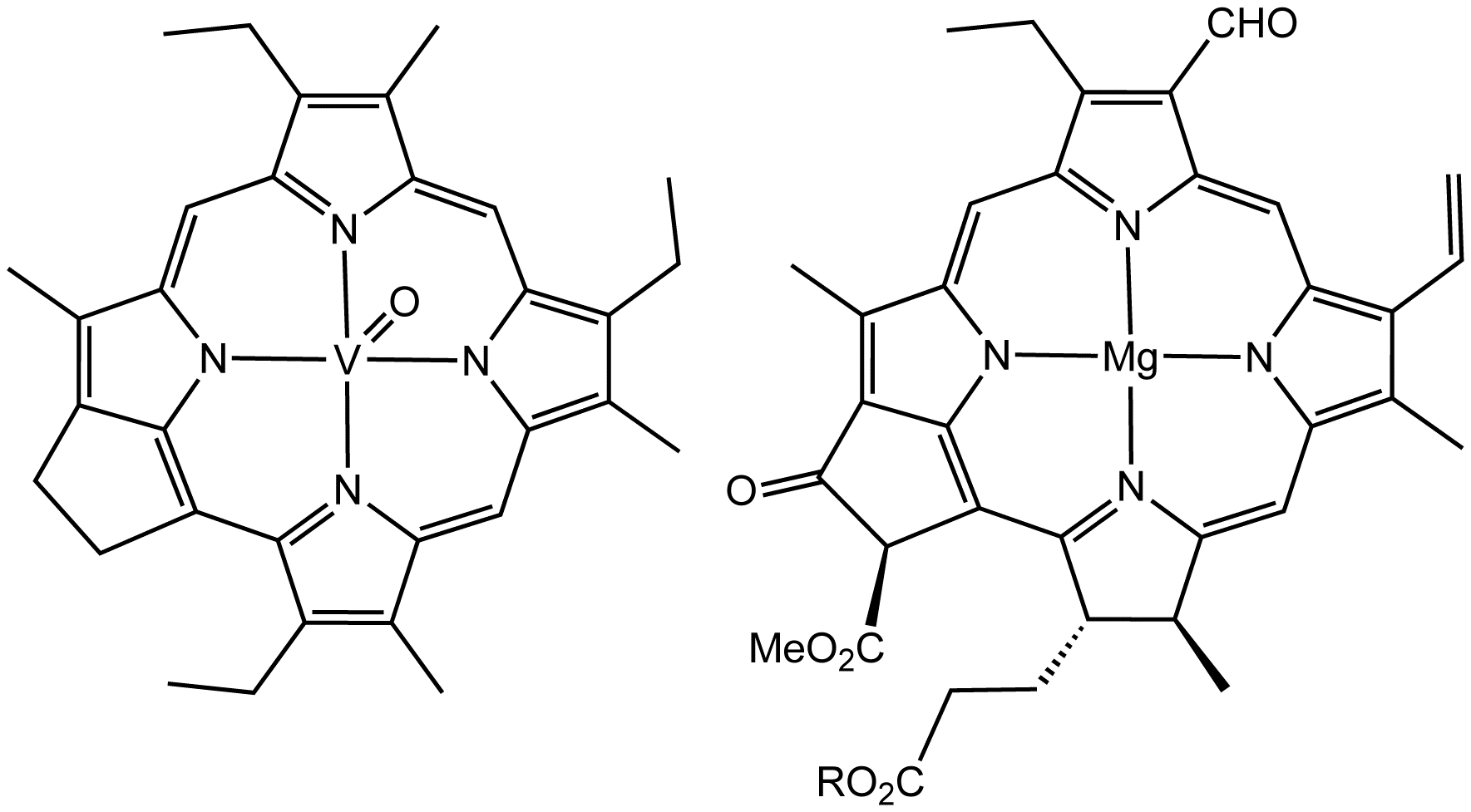
The close structural similarity of vanadium porphyrin compound (left) extracted from petroleum and chlorophyll a (right) established the biological origin of petroleum.

The word petroleum comes from Medieval Latin petroleum (literally 'rock oil'), which comes from Latin petra 'rock' (from Greek pétra πέτρα) and oleum 'oil' (from Greek élaion ἔλαιον). The origin of the term stems from monasteries in southern Italy where it was in use by the end of the first millennium as an alternative for the oldest term "naphtha". After that, the term was used in numerous manuscripts and books, such as in the treatise De Natura Fossilium, published in 1546 by German mineralogist Georg Bauer. After the advent of the oil industry during the second half of the 19th century, the term became commonly known for the liquid form of hydrocarbons.

== History ==
=== Early ===
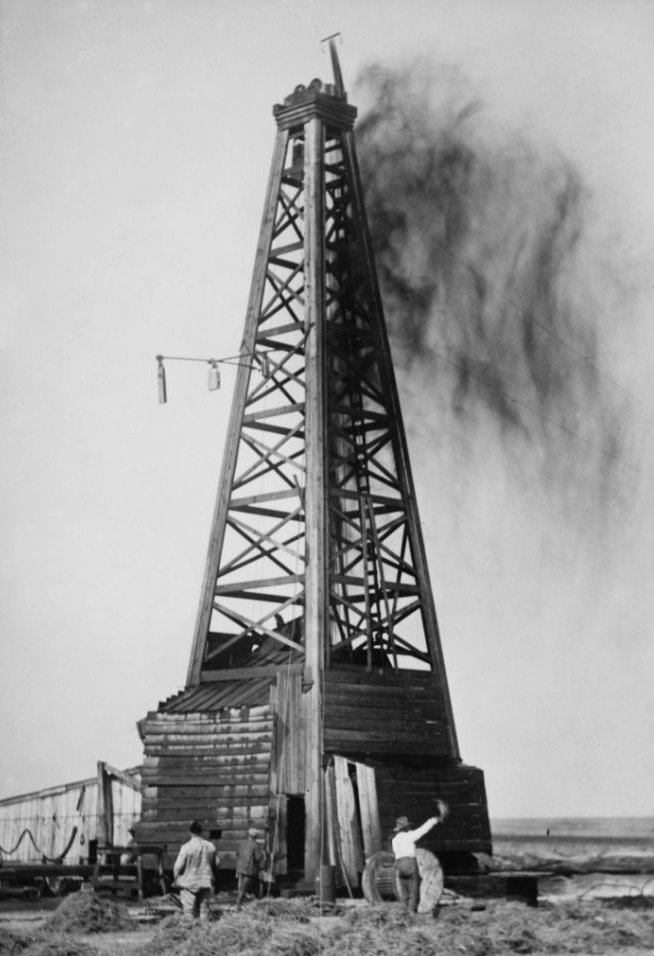
An oil derrick in Okemah, Oklahoma in 1922

Petroleum in some form has been used since ancient times. More than 4,300 years ago, bitumen was mentioned when the Sumerians used it to make boats. A tablet of the legend of the birth of Sargon of Akkad mentions a basket which was closed by straw and bitumen. More than 4,000 years ago, according to Herodotus and Diodorus Siculus, asphalt (bitumen) was used in the construction of the walls and towers of Babylon; there were oil pits near Ardericca and Babylon and a pitch spring on Zakynthos. In Babylon, petroleum was used for road construction, ship caulking, and medicine.

The use of petroleum in ancient China dates back more than 2,000 years. The I Ching, one of the earliest Chinese writings, cites that oil in its raw state, without refining, was first discovered, extracted, and used in China in the 1st century BCE. In addition, the Chinese were the first to record the use of petroleum as fuel as early as the 4th century BCE. By 347 CE, oil was produced from bamboo-drilled wells in China.

In the 7th century, petroleum was among the essential ingredients for Greek fire, an incendiary projectile weapon that was used by Byzantine Greeks against Arab ships attacking Constantinople. Crude oil was distilled by Persian chemists, with clear descriptions given in Arabic handbooks such as those of Abu Bakr al-Razi.

In the 9th century, oil fields were exploited in the area around modern Baku, Azerbaijan. These fields were described by Abu Bakr al-Razi in the 10th century and by Marco Polo in the 13th century, who describes the output of those wells as hundreds of shiploads. Arab and Persian chemists distilled crude oil to produce flammable products for military purposes. Through Islamic Spain, distillation became available in Western Europe by the 12th century. It was present in Romania since the 13th century, being recorded as păcură.

Sophisticated oil pits, 4.5 to 6 metres (15 to 20 ft) deep, were dug by the Seneca people and other Iroquois in Western Pennsylvania as early as 1415–1450. The French General Louis-Joseph de Montcalm encountered Seneca using petroleum for ceremonial fires and as a healing lotion during a visit to Fort Duquesne in 1750. Early British explorers to Myanmar documented a flourishing oil extraction industry based in Yenangyaung that, in 1795, had hundreds of hand-dug wells under production. Merkwiller-Pechelbronn is said to be the first European site where petroleum has been explored and used.

=== 19th century ===
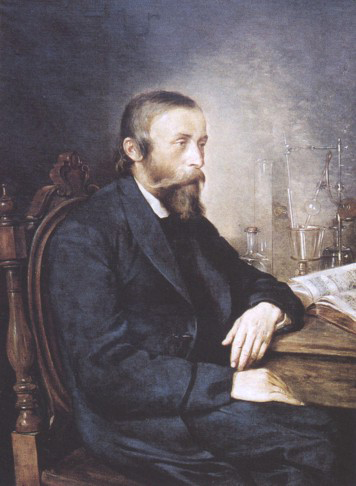
Ignacy Łukasiewicz, credited with the first commercial oil extraction in 1854 in Bóbrka, Poland, and opening the world's first industrial oil refinery

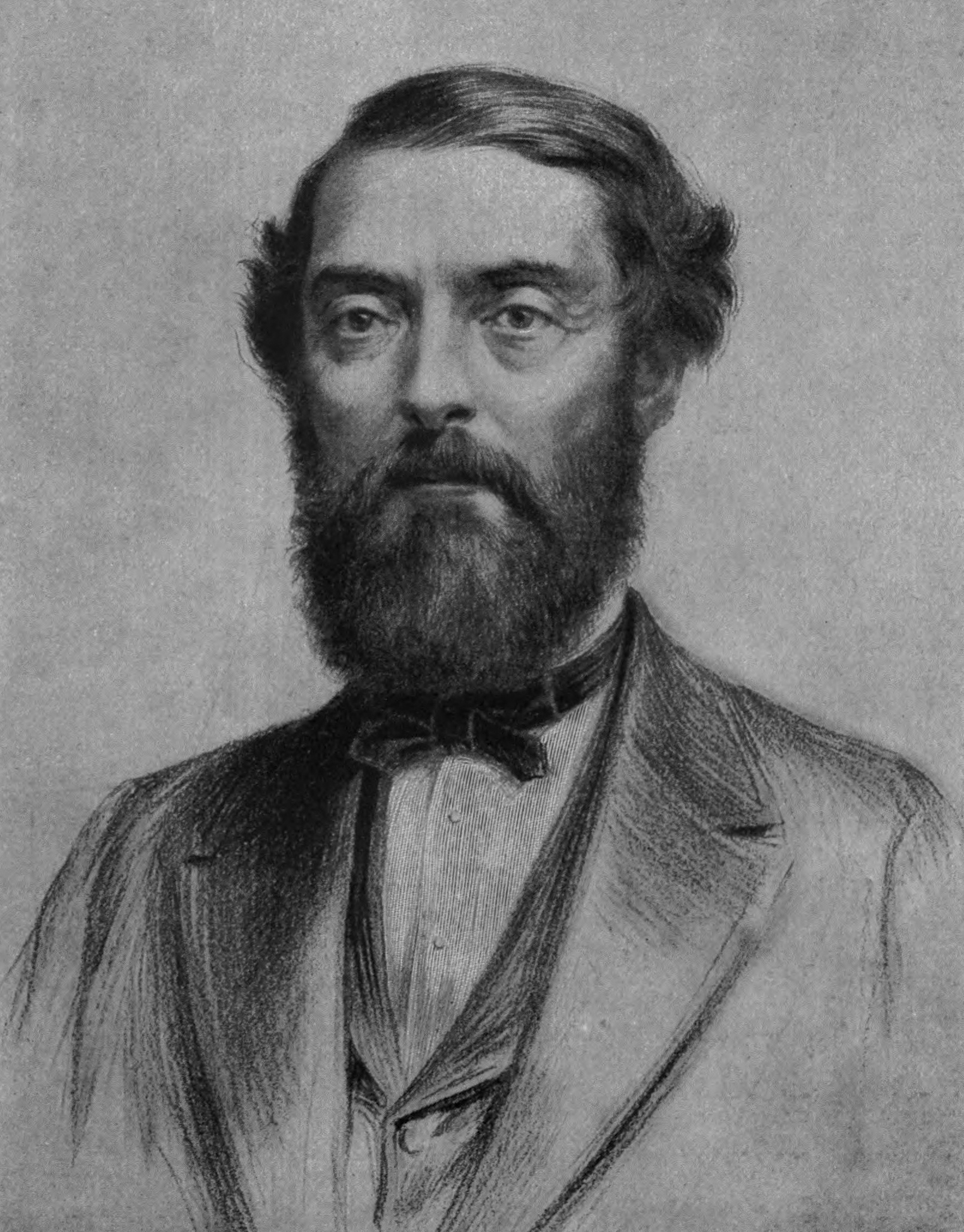
In 1859, Edwin Drake drilled the world's first successful oil well at what is now known as Drake Well in Cherrytree Township, Pennsylvania.

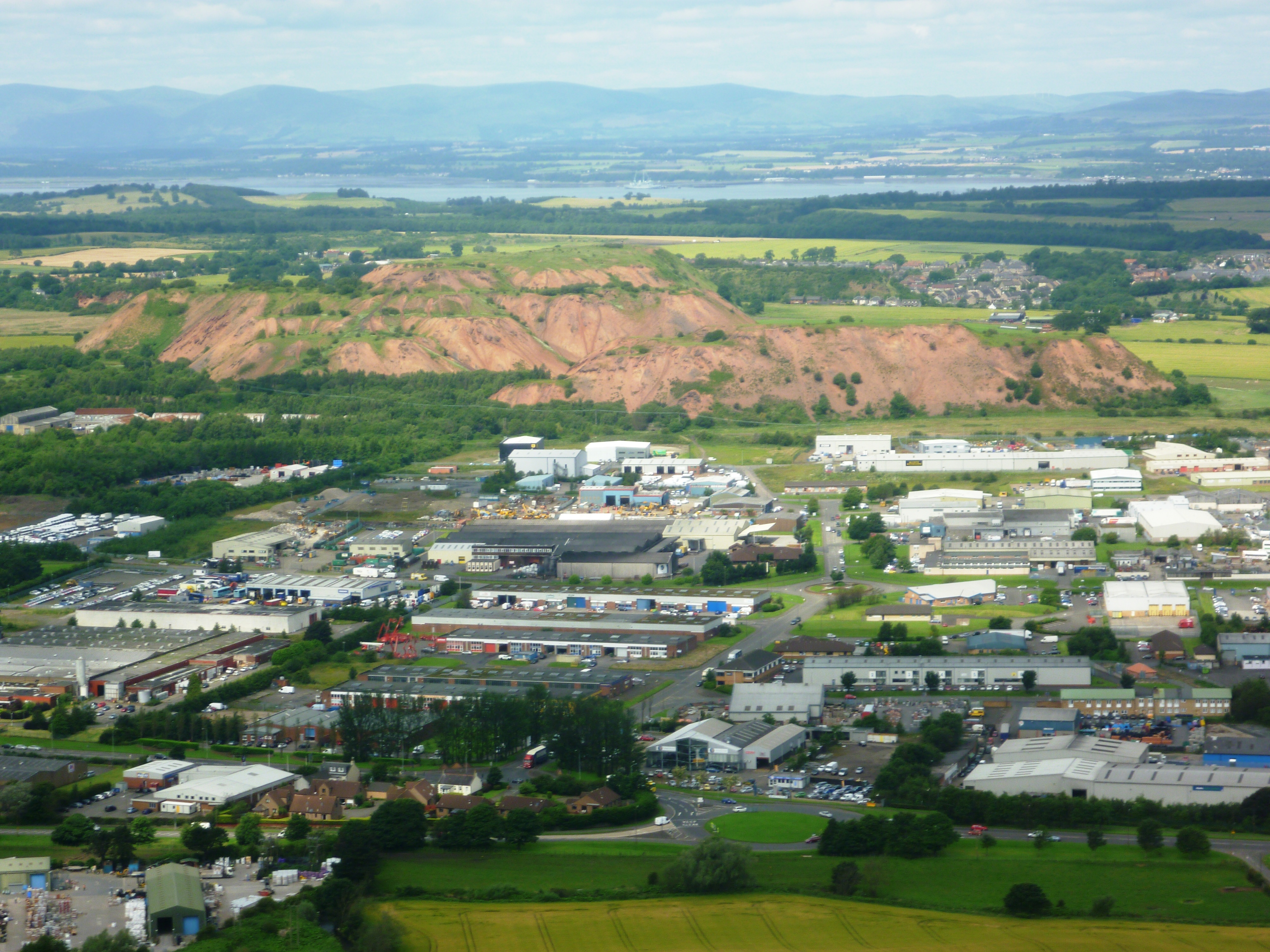
Shale bings near Broxburn, three of a total of 19 in West Lothian, Scotland

In the mid-19th century, oil wells developed quickly in various parts of the world, though the title of the "first oil well" depends on the criteria. In 1846, a group of Russian Imperial engineers directed by Major Alexeyev of the Bakinskii Corps of Mining Engineers accidentally struck oil while hand-drilling with a primitive percussion rig in Bibi-Heybat, near Baku (now Azerbaijan), though they were not specifically searching for oil. In 1853, Ignacy Łukasiewicz, who discovered how to distill kerosene from seep crude oil and invented the modern kerosene lamp, hand-dug the first intentional well for commercial oil extraction in Bóbrka, Poland, to supply fuel for lighting (still operational as of 2025). A hand-dug well and another refinery followed in 1857 near Ploiești, Romania. Romania (then a vassal of the Ottoman Empire) was the first country in the world to have its annual crude oil output officially recorded in international statistics – 275 tonnes for 1857.

In 1858, Georg Christian Konrad Hunäus found a significant amount of petroleum while drilling for lignite in Wietze, Germany. Wietze later provided about 80% of German consumption in the Wilhelmine Era. The production stopped in 1963, but Wietze has hosted a petroleum museum since 1970. Oil sands have been mined since the 18th century. In Wietze, natural asphalt/bitumen has been explored since the 18th century. Both in Pechelbronn as in Wietze, the coal industry dominated the petroleum technologies.

Chemist James Young in 1847 noticed a natural petroleum seepage in the coal mine at Riddings, Derbyshire, from which he distilled a light thin oil suitable for use as lamp oil, at the same time obtaining a more viscous oil suitable for lubricating machinery. In 1848, Young set up a small business refining crude oil. Young eventually succeeded (by distilling cannel coal at low heat) in creating a fluid resembling petroleum, which when treated in the same way as the seep oil gave similar products. Young found that by slow distillation he could obtain several useful liquids from it, one of which he named "paraffine oil" because at low temperatures it congealed into a substance resembling paraffin wax. The production of these oils and solid paraffin wax from coal formed the subject of his patent dated October 17, 1850. In 1850, Young & Meldrum and Edward William Binney entered into partnership under the title of E.W. Binney & Co. at Bathgate in West Lothian and E. Meldrum & Co. at Glasgow; their works at Bathgate were completed in 1851 and became the first truly commercial oil-works in the world with the first modern oil refinery.

The demand for petroleum as a fuel for lighting in North America and around the world quickly grew. The first oil well in the Americas was drilled in 1859 by Edwin Drake at what is now called the Drake Well in Cherrytree Township, Pennsylvania. There also was a company associated with it, and it sparked an oil boom and rapid expansion of the global petroleum industry. The same year, engine-drilled wells appeared in West Virginia.

The first commercial oil well in Canada became operational in 1858 at Oil Springs, Ontario. Businessman James Miller Williams dug several wells between 1855 and 1858 before discovering a rich reserve of oil four metres below ground. Williams extracted 1.5 million litres of crude oil by 1860, refining much of it into kerosene lamp oil. Williams's well became commercially viable a year before Drake's Pennsylvania operation and could be argued to be the first commercial oil well in North America. The discovery at Oil Springs touched off an oil boom which brought hundreds of speculators and workers to the area. Advances in drilling continued into 1862 when local driller Shaw reached a depth of 62 metres using the spring-pole drilling method. On January 16, 1862, after an explosion of natural gas, Canada's first oil gusher came into production, shooting into the air at a recorded rate of 480 cubic metres (3,000 bbl) per day. By the end of the 19th century the Russian Empire, particularly the Branobel company in Azerbaijan, had taken the lead in production.

=== 20th century ===
In the 1930s, Alfred Treibs determined the biological origin of petroleum, which was previously controversial.

Access to oil was a major factor in several military conflicts of the 20th century, including World War II, during which oil facilities were a major strategic asset and were extensively bombed. The German invasion of the Soviet Union included the goal to capture the Baku oilfields, as it would provide much-needed oil supplies for the German military which was suffering from blockades.

Oil exploration in North America during the early 20th century led to the U.S. becoming the leading producer by mid-century. As petroleum production in the U.S. peaked during the 1960s, the United States was surpassed by Saudi Arabia and the Soviet Union in total output.

During the 1973 oil crisis, Saudi Arabia and other Arab nations imposed an oil embargo against the United States, the United Kingdom, Japan and other Western nations which supported Israel in the Yom Kippur War. This was followed by the 1979 oil crisis, which was caused by a drop in oil production in the wake of the Iranian Revolution and caused oil prices to more than double. The two oil price shocks had many short and long-term effects on global politics and the global economy. They led to sustained reductions in demand as a result of substitution to other fuels, especially coal and nuclear, and improvements in energy efficiency, facilitated by government policies. High oil prices also induced investment in oil production by non-OPEC countries, including Prudhoe Bay in Alaska, the North Sea offshore fields of the United Kingdom and Norway, the Cantarell offshore field of Mexico, and oil sands in Canada.

=== 21st century ===
About 89 percent of vehicular fuel needs are met by oil. Petroleum makes up 38 percent of total energy consumption in the United States, but is responsible for only 0.4 percent of electricity generation. Petroleum's worth as a portable, dense energy source powering the vast majority of vehicles and as the base of many industrial chemicals makes it one of the world's most important commodities. The top three oil-producing countries as of 2018 are the United States, Russia, and Saudi Arabia. In 2018, due in part to developments in hydraulic fracturing and horizontal drilling, the United States became the world's largest producer.

About 80 percent of the world's readily accessible reserves are located in the Middle East, with 62.5 percent coming from the Arab five: Saudi Arabia, United Arab Emirates, Iraq, Qatar, and Kuwait. A large portion of the world's total oil exists as unconventional sources, such as bitumen in Athabasca oil sands and extra heavy oil in the Orinoco Belt. While significant volumes of oil are extracted from oil sands, particularly in Canada, logistical and technical hurdles remain, as oil extraction requires large amounts of heat and water, making its net energy content quite low relative to conventional crude oil. Thus, Canada's oil sands are not expected to provide more than a few million barrels per day in the foreseeable future.

Many modern geopolitical conflicts are to do with petroleum.

== Composition ==
Petroleum consists of a variety of liquid, gaseous, and solid components. Lighter hydrocarbons are the gases methane, ethane, propane and butane. Otherwise the bulk of the liquid and solids are largely heavier organic compounds, often hydrocarbons (C and H only). The proportion of light hydrocarbons in a petroleum mixture varies among oil fields.

An oil well produces predominantly crude oil. Because the pressure is lower at the surface than underground, some of the gas will come out of solution and be recovered (or burned) as associated gas or solution gas. A gas well produces predominantly natural gas. However, because the underground temperature is higher than at the surface, the gas may contain heavier hydrocarbons such as pentane, hexane, and heptane ("natural-gas condensate", often shortened to condensate.) Condensate resembles gasoline in appearance and is similar in composition to some volatile light crude oils.

The hydrocarbons in crude oil are mostly alkanes, cycloalkanes and various aromatic hydrocarbons, while the other organic compounds contain nitrogen, oxygen, and sulfur, and traces of metals such as iron, nickel, copper and vanadium. Many oil reservoirs contain live bacteria. The molecular composition of crude oil varies widely from formation to formation, but the proportion of chemical elements varies over fairly narrow limits as follows:

Composition by weight
Element	Percent range
Carbon	83 to 85%
Hydrogen	10 to 14%
Nitrogen	0.1 to 2%
Oxygen	0.05 to 1.5%
Sulfur	0.05 to 6.0%
Metals	< 0.1%

Four different types of hydrocarbon appear in crude oil. The relative percentage of each varies, determining the properties of each oil.

Composition by weight
Hydrocarbon	Average	Range
Alkanes (paraffins)	30%	15 to 60%
Naphthenes	49%	30 to 60%
Aromatics	15%	3 to 30%
Asphaltics	6%	remainder

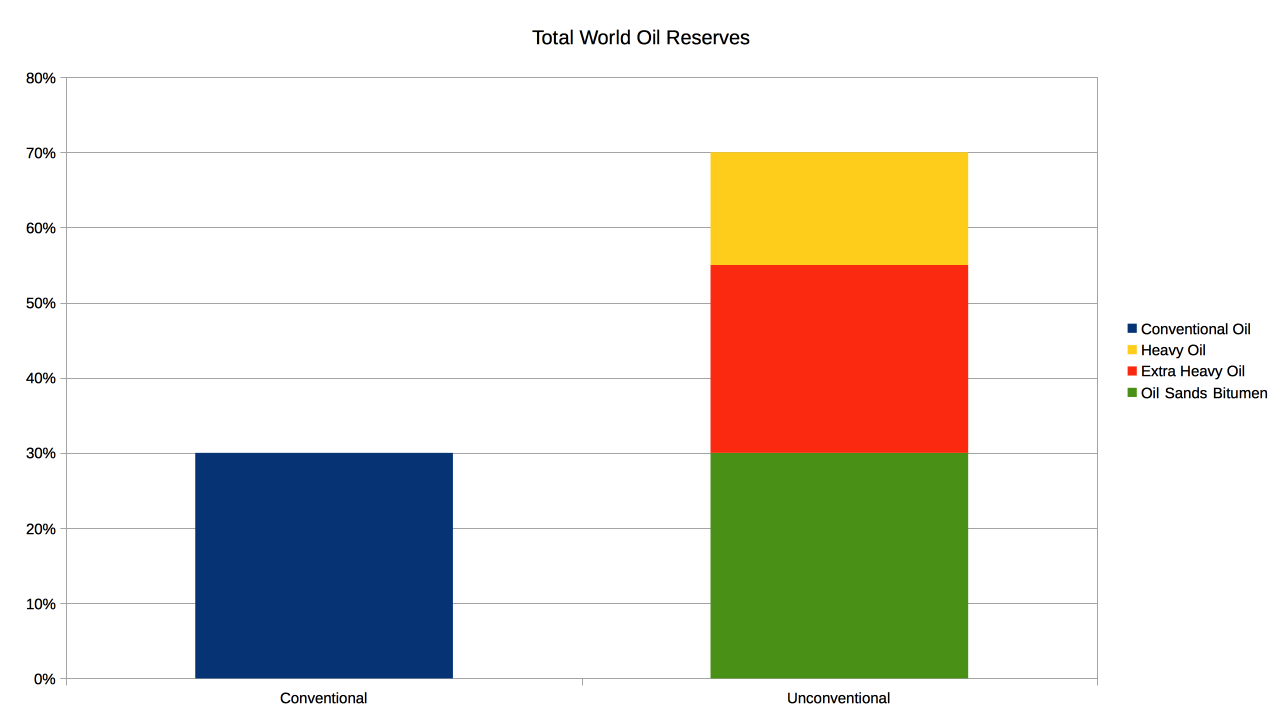
Unconventional reserves are much larger than conventional ones.

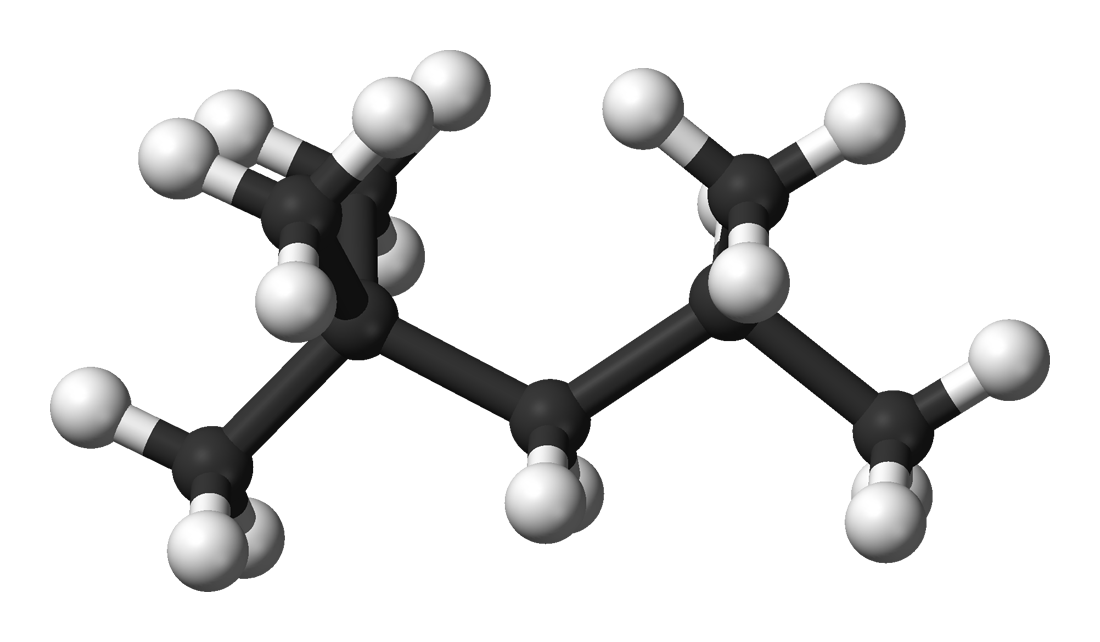
2,2,4-Trimethylpentane, a hydrocarbon with the octane number of 100. Black spheres are carbon and white spheres are hydrogen atoms.

The alkanes from pentane (C_{5}H_{12}) to octane (C_{8}H_{18}) are refined into gasoline, the ones from nonane (C_{9}H_{20}) to hexadecane (C_{16}H_{34}) into diesel fuel, kerosene and jet fuel. Alkanes with more than 16 carbon atoms can be refined into fuel oil and lubricating oil. At the heavier end of the range, paraffin wax is an alkane with approximately 25 carbon atoms, while asphalt has 35 and up, although these are usually cracked in modern refineries into more valuable products. The lightest fraction, the so-called petroleum gases, are subjected to diverse processing depending on cost. These gases are either flared off, sold as liquefied petroleum gas, or used to power the refinery's own burners. During the winter, butane (C_{4}H_{10}) is blended into the gasoline pool at high rates because its high vapour pressure assists with cold starts. The aromatic hydrocarbons are unsaturated hydrocarbons that have one or more benzene rings. They tend to burn with a sooty flame, and many have a sweet aroma. Some are carcinogenic.

These different components are separated by fractional distillation at an oil refinery to produce gasoline, jet fuel, kerosene, and other hydrocarbon fractions. The components in an oil sample can be determined by gas chromatography and mass spectrometry. Due to the large number of co-eluted hydrocarbons within oil, many cannot be resolved by traditional gas chromatography. This unresolved complex mixture (UCM) of hydrocarbons is particularly apparent when analysing weathered oils and extracts from tissues of organisms exposed to oil.

Crude oil varies greatly in appearance depending on its composition. It is usually black or dark brown (although it may be yellowish, reddish, or even greenish). In the reservoir it is usually found in association with natural gas (which being lighter forms a "gas cap" over the petroleum) and saline water (which being heavier than most forms of crude oil, generally sinks beneath it). Crude oil may also be found in a semi-solid form mixed with sand and water, as in the Athabasca oil sands in Canada, where it is usually referred to as crude bitumen. In Canada, bitumen is considered a sticky, black, tar-like form of crude oil which is so thick and heavy that it must be heated or diluted before it will flow. Venezuela also has large amounts of oil in the Orinoco oil sands, although the hydrocarbons trapped in them are less viscous than in Canada and are usually called extra heavy oil. Oil sands resources are called unconventional oil to distinguish them from oil which can be extracted using traditional oil well methods. Between them, Canada and Venezuela contain an estimated 3.6 trillion barrels (570×10^{9} m^{3}) of bitumen and extra heavy oil, about twice the volume of the world's reserves of conventional oil.

== Formation ==
=== Fossil petroleum ===
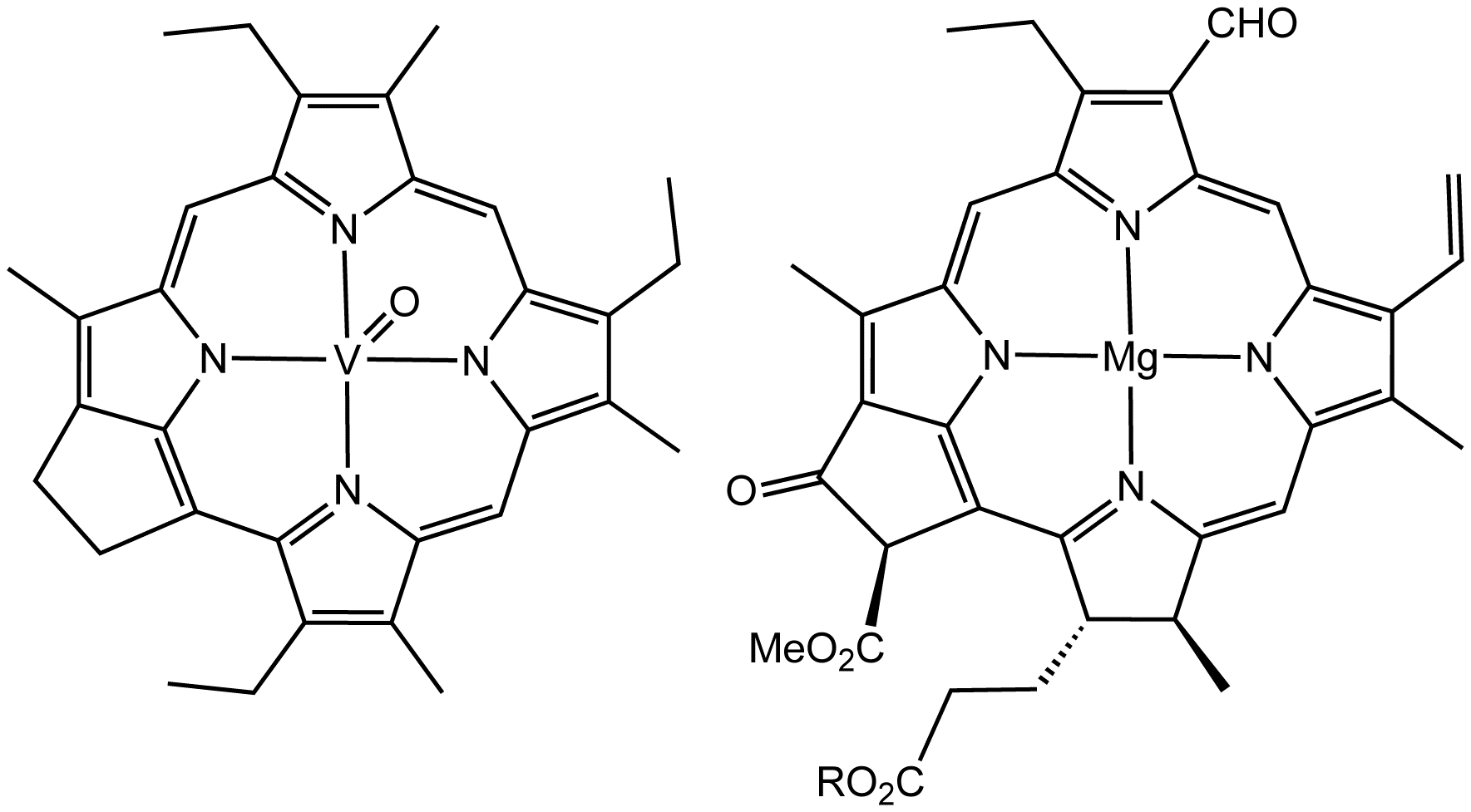
Structure of a vanadium porphyrin compound (left) extracted from petroleum by Alfred E. Treibs, father of organic geochemistry. Treibs noted the close structural similarity of this molecule and chlorophyll a (right).

Petroleum is a fossil fuel derived from fossilized organic materials, such as zooplankton and algae. Vast amounts of these remains settled to sea or lake bottoms where they were covered in stagnant water (water with no dissolved oxygen) or sediments (such as mud and silt) faster than they could decompose aerobically. Approximately 1 m below this sediment, water oxygen concentration was low, below 0.1 mg/L, and anoxic conditions existed. Temperatures also remained constant.

As further layers settled into the sea or lake bed, intense heat and pressure built up in the lower regions. This process caused the organic matter to change, first into a waxy material known as kerogen (found in various oil shales around the world) and then with more heat into liquid and gaseous hydrocarbons via a process known as catagenesis. Formation of petroleum occurs from hydrocarbon pyrolysis in a variety of mainly endothermic reactions at high temperatures or pressures, or both. These phases are described in detail below.

==== Anaerobic decay ====
In the absence of plentiful oxygen, aerobic bacteria were prevented from decaying the organic matter after it was buried under a layer of sediment or water. However, anaerobic bacteria were able to reduce sulfates and nitrates among the matter to H_{2}S and N_{2} respectively by using the matter as a source for other reactants. Due to such anaerobic bacteria, at first, this matter began to break apart mostly via hydrolysis: polysaccharides and proteins were hydrolyzed to simple sugars and amino acids respectively. These were further anaerobically oxidized at an accelerated rate by the enzymes of the bacteria: e.g., proteins went through oxidative deamination to amino acids, which in turn reacted further to ammonia and α-keto acids. Monosaccharides in turn ultimately decayed to CO_{2} and methane. The anaerobic decay products of amino acids, monosaccharides, phenols and aldehydes combined into fulvic acids. Fats and waxes were not extensively hydrolyzed under these mild conditions.

==== Kerogen formation ====
Some phenolic compounds produced from previous reactions worked as bactericides and the Actinomycetales order of bacteria also produced antibiotic compounds (e.g., streptomycin). Thus the action of anaerobic bacteria ceased at about 10 m below the water or sediment. The mixture at this depth contained fulvic acids, unreacted and partially reacted fats and waxes, slightly modified lignin, resins and other hydrocarbons. As more layers of organic matter settled into the sea or lake bed, intense heat and pressure built up in the lower regions. As a consequence, compounds of this mixture began to combine in poorly understood ways to kerogen. Combination happened in a similar fashion as phenol and formaldehyde molecules react to urea-formaldehyde resins, but kerogen formation occurred in a more complex manner due to a bigger variety of reactants. The total process of kerogen formation from the beginning of anaerobic decay is called diagenesis, a word that means a transformation of materials by dissolution and recombination of their constituents.

==== Transformation of kerogen into fossil fuels ====
Kerogen formation continued to a depth of about 1 km from the Earth's surface where temperatures may reach around 50 °C. Kerogen formation represents a halfway point between organic matter and fossil fuels: kerogen can be exposed to oxygen, oxidize and thus be lost, or it could be buried deeper inside the Earth's crust and be subjected to conditions which allow it to slowly transform into fossil fuels like petroleum. The latter happened through catagenesis in which the reactions were mostly radical rearrangements of kerogen. These reactions took thousands to millions of years, and no external reactants were involved. Due to the radical nature of these reactions, kerogen reacted towards two classes of products: those with low H/C ratio (anthracene or products similar to it) and those with high H/C ratio (methane or products similar to it); i.e., carbon-rich or hydrogen-rich products. Because catagenesis was closed off from external reactants, the resulting composition of the fuel mixture was dependent on the composition of the kerogen via reaction stoichiometry. Three types of kerogen exist: type I (algal), II (liptinic) and III (humic), which were formed mainly from algae, plankton and woody plants (this term includes trees, shrubs and lianas) respectively.

The hydrocarbon-generating potential and thermal maturity of petroleum source rocks are commonly evaluated using Rock-Eval pyrolysis and vitrinite reflectance measurements, which provide quantitative indicators of organic matter type, maturation level, and the likelihood of oil or gas generation.

Catagenesis was pyrolytic despite the fact that it happened at relatively low temperatures (when compared to commercial pyrolysis plants) of 60 to several hundred °C. Pyrolysis was possible because of the long reaction times involved. Heat for catagenesis came from the decomposition of radioactive materials of the crust, especially ^{40}K, ^{232}Th, ^{235}U and ^{238}U. The heat varied with geothermal gradient and was typically 10–30 °C per km of depth from the Earth's surface. Unusual magma intrusions, however, could have created greater localized heating.

==== Oil window (temperature range) ====
Geologists often refer to the temperature range in which oil forms as an "oil window". Below the minimum temperature oil remains trapped in the form of kerogen. Above the maximum temperature the oil is converted to natural gas through the process of thermal cracking. Sometimes, oil formed at extreme depths may migrate and become trapped at a much shallower level. The Athabasca oil sands are one example of this.

=== Abiogenic petroleum ===
An alternative mechanism to the one described above was proposed by Russian scientists in the mid-1850s, the hypothesis of abiogenic petroleum origin (petroleum formed by inorganic means), but this is contradicted by geological and geochemical evidence. Abiogenic sources of oil have been found but never in commercially profitable amounts. "The controversy isn't over whether abiogenic oil reserves exist," said Larry Nation of the American Association of Petroleum Geologists. "The controversy is over how much they contribute to Earth's overall reserves and how much time and effort geologists should devote to seeking them out."

== Reservoirs ==
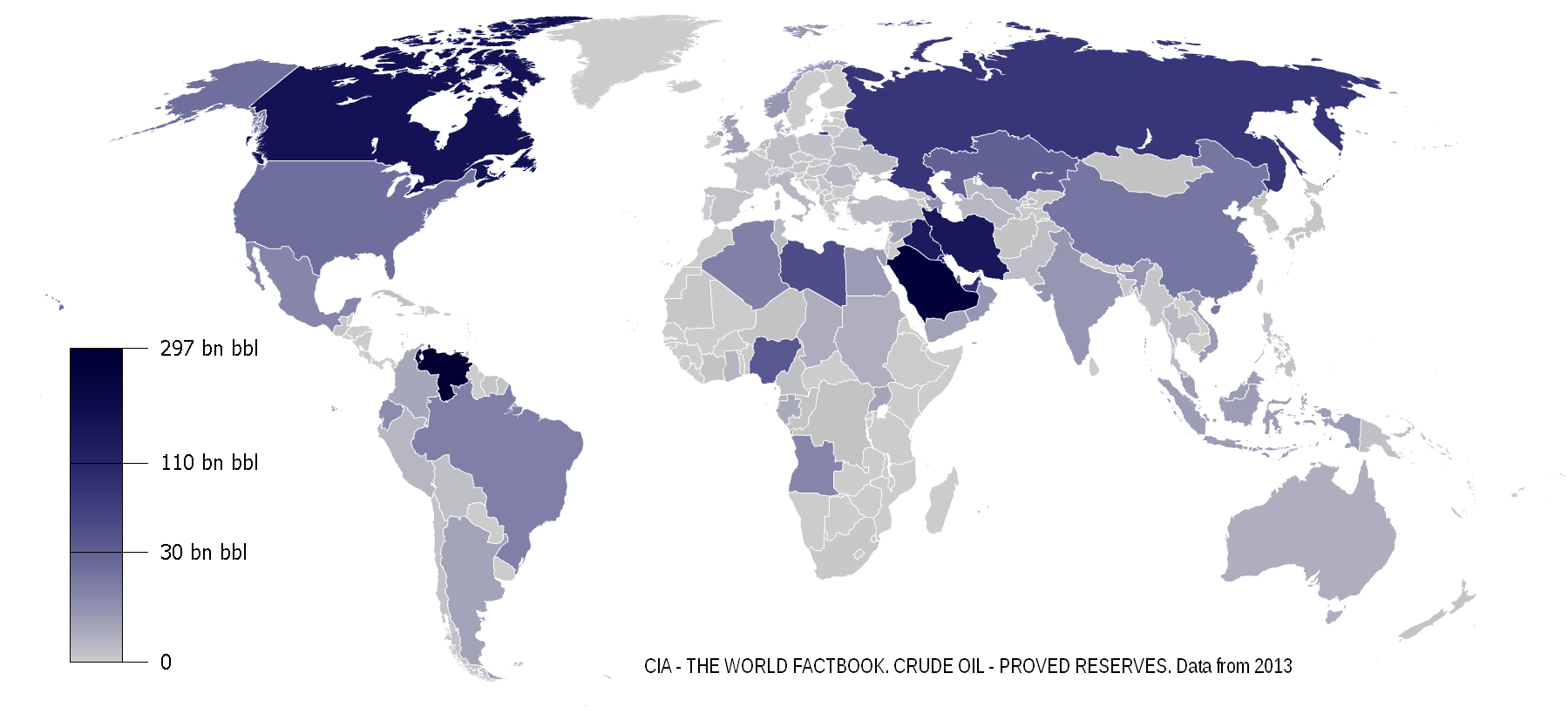
World oil reserves as of 2013

Venezuela and Middle Eastern countries have the largest proven crude oil reserves.

A hydrocarbon trap consists of a reservoir rock (yellow) where oil (red) can accumulate, and a caprock (green) that prevents it from egressing.

Three conditions must be present for a petroleum reservoir to form:

- A source rock rich in hydrocarbon material buried deeply enough for subterranean heat to cook it into oil,
- A porous and permeable reservoir rock where it can accumulate,
- A caprock (seal) or other mechanism to prevent the oil from escaping to the surface.

Within these reservoirs, fluids will typically organize themselves like a three-layer cake with a layer of water below the oil layer and a layer of gas above it, although the different layers vary in size between reservoirs. Because most hydrocarbons are less dense than rock or water, they often migrate upward through adjacent rock layers until either reaching the surface or becoming trapped within porous rocks (known as reservoirs) by impermeable rocks above. However, the process is influenced by underground water flows, causing oil to migrate hundreds of kilometres horizontally or even short distances downward before becoming trapped in a reservoir. When hydrocarbons are concentrated in a trap, an oil field forms, from which the liquid can be extracted by drilling and pumping.

The reactions that produce oil and natural gas are often modeled as first order breakdown reactions, where hydrocarbons are broken down to oil and natural gas by a set of parallel reactions, and oil eventually breaks down to natural gas by another set of reactions. The latter set is regularly used in petrochemical plants and oil refineries.

Petroleum has mostly been recovered by oil drilling (natural petroleum springs are rare). Drilling is carried out after studies of structural geology (at the reservoir scale), sedimentary basin analysis, and reservoir characterisation (mainly in terms of the porosity and permeability of geologic reservoir structures). Wells are drilled into oil reservoirs to extract the crude oil. "Natural lift" production methods that rely on the natural reservoir pressure to force the oil to the surface are usually sufficient for a while after reservoirs are first tapped. In some reservoirs, such as in the Middle East, the natural pressure is sufficient over a long time. The natural pressure in most reservoirs, however, eventually dissipates. Then the oil must be extracted using "artificial lift" means. Over time, these "primary" methods become less effective and "secondary" production methods may be used. A common secondary method is "waterflood" or injection of water into the reservoir to increase pressure and force the oil to the drilled shaft or "wellbore". Eventually "tertiary" or "enhanced" oil recovery methods may be used to increase the oil's flow characteristics by injecting steam, carbon dioxide and other gases or chemicals into the reservoir. In the United States, primary production methods account for less than 40 percent of the oil produced on a daily basis, secondary methods account for about 50 percent, and tertiary recovery the remaining 10 percent. Extracting oil (or "bitumen") from oil/tar sand and oil shale deposits requires mining the sand or shale and heating it in a vessel or retort, or using "in-situ" methods of injecting heated liquids into the deposit and then pumping the liquid back out saturated with oil.

=== Unconventional oil reservoirs ===
Oil-eating bacteria biodegrade oil that has escaped to the surface. Oil sands are reservoirs of partially biodegraded oil still in the process of escaping and being biodegraded, but they contain so much migrating oil that, although most of it has escaped, vast amounts are still present—more than can be found in conventional oil reservoirs. The lighter fractions of the crude oil are destroyed first, resulting in reservoirs containing an extremely heavy form of crude oil, called crude bitumen in Canada, or extra-heavy crude oil in Venezuela. These two countries have the world's largest deposits of oil sands.

On the other hand, oil shales are source rocks that have not been exposed to heat or pressure long enough to convert their trapped hydrocarbons into crude oil. Technically speaking, oil shales are not always shales and do not contain oil, but are fined-grain sedimentary rocks containing an insoluble organic solid called kerogen. The kerogen in the rock can be converted into crude oil using heat and pressure to simulate natural processes. The method has been known for centuries and was patented in 1694 under British Crown Patent No. 330 covering, "A way to extract and make great quantities of pitch, tar, and oil out of a sort of stone." Although oil shales are found in many countries, the United States has the world's largest deposits.

== Classification ==
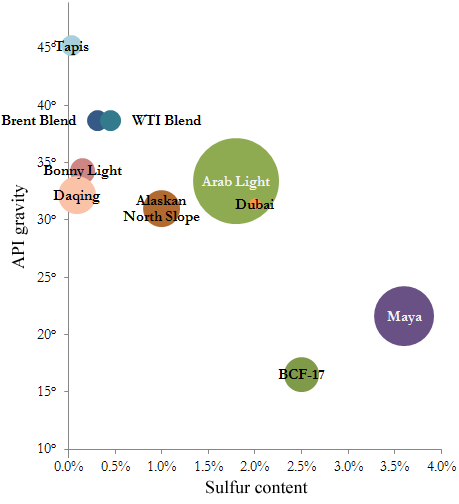
Some marker crudes with their sulfur content (horizontal) and API gravity (vertical) and relative production quantity

The petroleum industry generally classifies crude oil by the geographic location it is produced in (e.g., West Texas Intermediate, Brent, or Oman), its API gravity (an oil industry measure of density), and its sulfur content. Crude oil may be considered light if it has low density, heavy if it has high density, or medium if it has a density between that of light and heavy. Additionally, it may be referred to as sweet if it contains relatively little sulfur or sour if it contains substantial amounts of sulfur.

The geographic location is important because it affects transportation costs to the refinery. Light crude oil is more desirable than heavy oil since it produces a higher yield of gasoline, while sweet oil commands a higher price than sour oil because it has fewer environmental problems and requires less refining to meet sulfur standards imposed on fuels in consuming countries. Each crude oil has unique molecular characteristics which are revealed by the use of crude oil assay analysis in petroleum laboratories.

Barrels from an area in which the crude oil's molecular characteristics have been determined and the oil has been classified are used as pricing references throughout the world. Some of the common reference crudes are:

- West Texas Intermediate (WTI), a very high-quality, sweet, light oil delivered at Cushing, Oklahoma for North American oil.
- Brent Blend, consisting of 15 oils from fields in the Brent and Ninian systems in the East Shetland Basin of the North Sea. The oil lands at Sullom Voe terminal in Shetland. Oil production from Europe, Africa and Middle Eastern oil flowing West tends to be priced off this oil, which forms a benchmark.
- Dubai-Oman, used as a benchmark for the Middle East sour crude oil flowing to the Asia-Pacific region.
- Tapis (from Malaysia, used as a reference for light Far East oil).
- Minas (from Indonesia, used as a reference for heavy Far East oil).
- The OPEC Reference Basket, a weighted average of oil blends from various OPEC (Organization of the Petroleum Exporting Countries) countries
- Midway Sunset Heavy, by which heavy oil in California is priced.
- Western Canadian Select the benchmark crude oil for emerging heavy, high TAN (acidic) crudes.

There are declining amounts of these benchmark oils being produced each year, so other oils are more commonly what is actually delivered. While the reference price may be for WTI delivered at Cushing, the actual oil being traded may be a discounted Canadian heavy oil – Western Canadian Select – delivered at Hardisty, Alberta, and for a Brent Blend delivered at Shetland, it may be a discounted Russian Export Blend delivered at the port of Primorsk.

== Use ==
Once extracted, oil is refined and separated, most easily by distillation, into numerous products for direct use or use in manufacturing, such as gasoline (petrol), diesel and kerosene to asphalt and chemical reagents (ethylene, propylene, butene, acrylic acid, para-xylene) used to make plastics, pesticides and pharmaceuticals. In terms of volume, most petroleum is converted into fuels for combustion engines. In terms of value, petroleum underpins the petrochemical industry, which includes many high value products such as pharmaceuticals and plastics. By volume, 84% of hydrocarbons present in petroleum are converted into fuels.

=== Fuels and lubricants ===
Due to its high energy density, easy transportability and relative abundance, oil has become the world's most important source of energy since the mid-1950s. Petroleum is used mostly, by volume, for refining into fuel oil and gasoline, both important primary energy sources, including gasoline, diesel, jet, heating, and other fuel oils, and liquefied petroleum gas. Closely related to fuels for combustion engines are Lubricants, greases, and viscosity stabilizers.

=== Chemicals ===
Many pharmaceuticals are derived from petroleum, albeit via multi-step processes. Modern medicine depends on petroleum as a source of building blocks, reagents, and solvents. Similarly, virtually all pesticides, insecticides, and herbicides are derived from petroleum. Pesticides have profoundly affected life expectancies by controlling disease vectors and by increasing crop yield. Like pharmaceuticals, pesticides are in essence petrochemicals. Almost all plastics and synthetic polymers are derived from petroleum, which is the source of monomers. Alkenes (olefins) are one important class of these precursor molecules.

=== Other derivatives ===
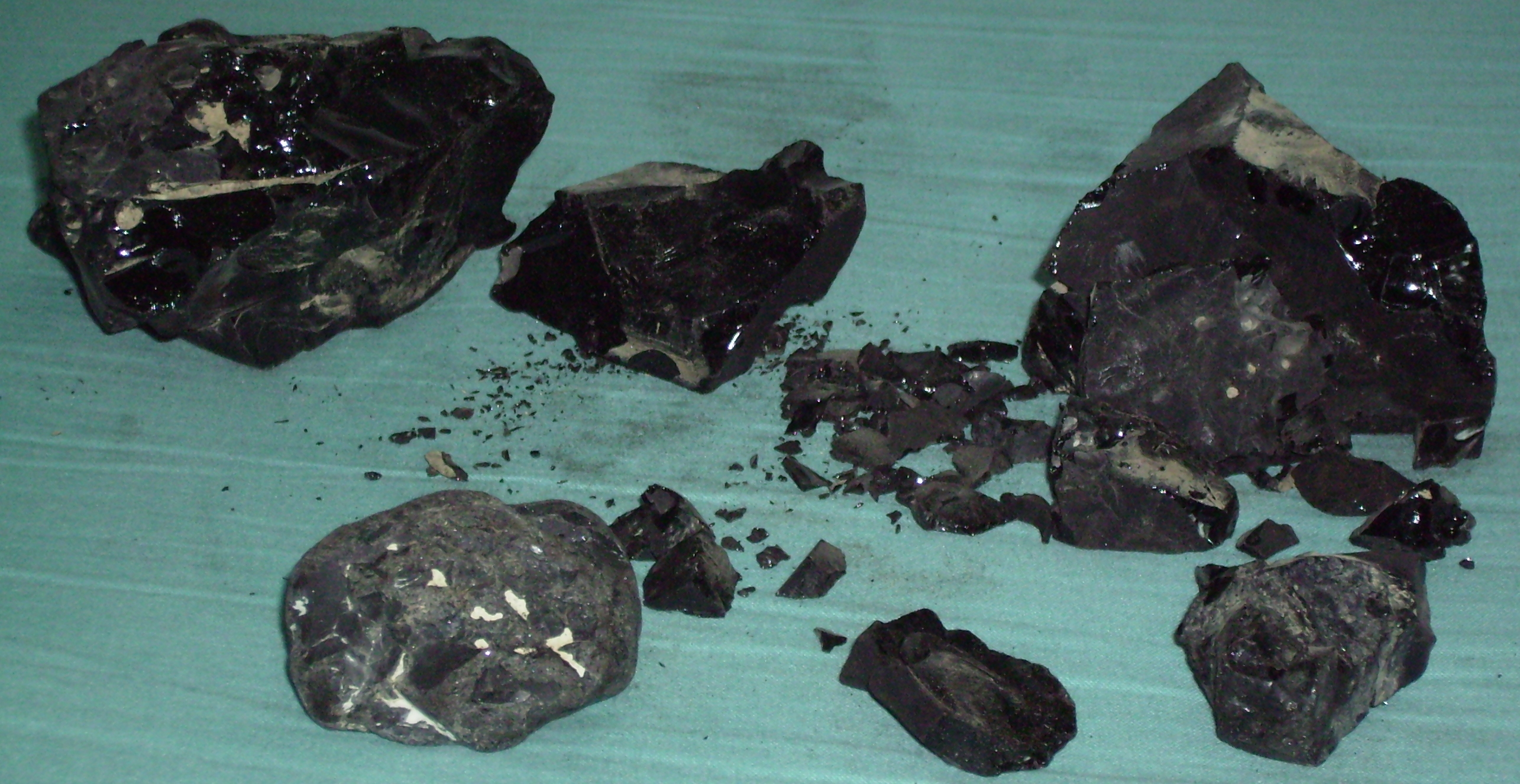
Natural bitumen, commonly referred to as Asphalt

- Wax, used in the packaging of frozen foods, among others, paraffin wax, derived from petroleum oil.
- Sulfur and its derivative sulfuric acid. Hydrogen sulfide is a product of sulfur removal from petroleum fraction. It is oxidized to elemental sulfur and then to sulfuric acid.
- Bulk tar and asphalt.
- Petroleum coke, used in speciality carbon products or as solid fuel.

== Industry ==
Petroleum industry map showing oil pipelines, natural gas pipelines, refineries, and petroleum fields

The petroleum industry, also known as the oil industry, includes the global processes of exploration, extraction, refining, transportation (often by oil tankers and pipelines), and marketing of petroleum products. The largest volume products of the industry are fuel oil and gasoline (petrol). Petroleum is also the raw material for many chemical products, including pharmaceuticals, solvents, fertilizers, pesticides, synthetic fragrances, and plastics. The industry is usually divided into three major components: upstream, midstream, and downstream. Upstream regards exploration and extraction of crude oil, midstream encompasses transportation and storage of it, and downstream concerns refining crude oil into various end products.

Petroleum is vital to many industries, and is necessary for the maintenance of industrial civilization in its current configuration, making it a critical concern for many nations. Oil accounts for a large percentage of the world's energy consumption, ranging from a low of 32% for Europe and Asia, to a high of 53% for the Middle East.

Other geographic regions' consumption patterns are as follows: South and Central America (44%), Africa (41%), and North America (40%). The world consumes 36 billion barrels (5.8 km^{3}) of oil per year, with developed nations being the largest consumers. The United States consumed 18% of the oil produced in 2015. The production, distribution, refining, and retailing of petroleum taken as a whole represents the world's largest industry in terms of dollar value.

=== Transport ===
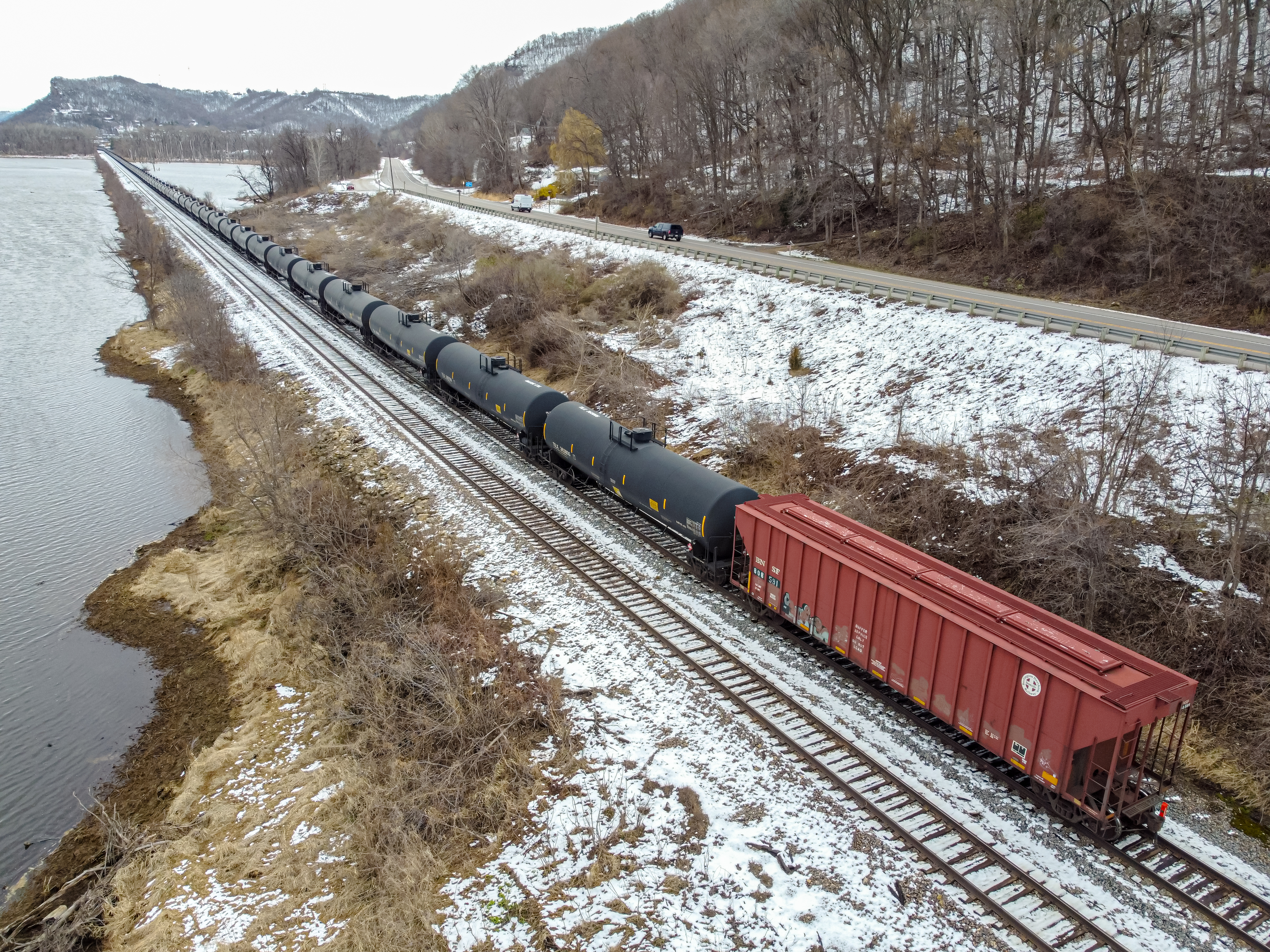
Oil train near La Crosse, Wisconsin

Petroleum transport is the transportation of petroleum and derivatives such as gasoline (petrol). Petroleum products are transported via rail cars, trucks, tanker vessels, and pipeline networks. The method used to move the petroleum products depends on the volume that is being moved and its destination. Land-based transportation modes such as pipelines and rail each have strengths and weaknesses. One of the key differences is the cost associated with transporting petroleum though pipeline or rail. The risks with moving petroleum products are pollution related and the chance of spillage. Petroleum oil is very hard to clean up and is very toxic to living animals and their surroundings.

In the 1950s, shipping costs made up 33% of the price of oil transported from the Persian Gulf to the United States, but with the development of supertankers in the 1970s, the cost of shipping dropped to 5% of the price of Persian oil in the US. The share of the shipping cost on the final cost of the delivered commodity was less than 3% in 2010.

=== Price ===
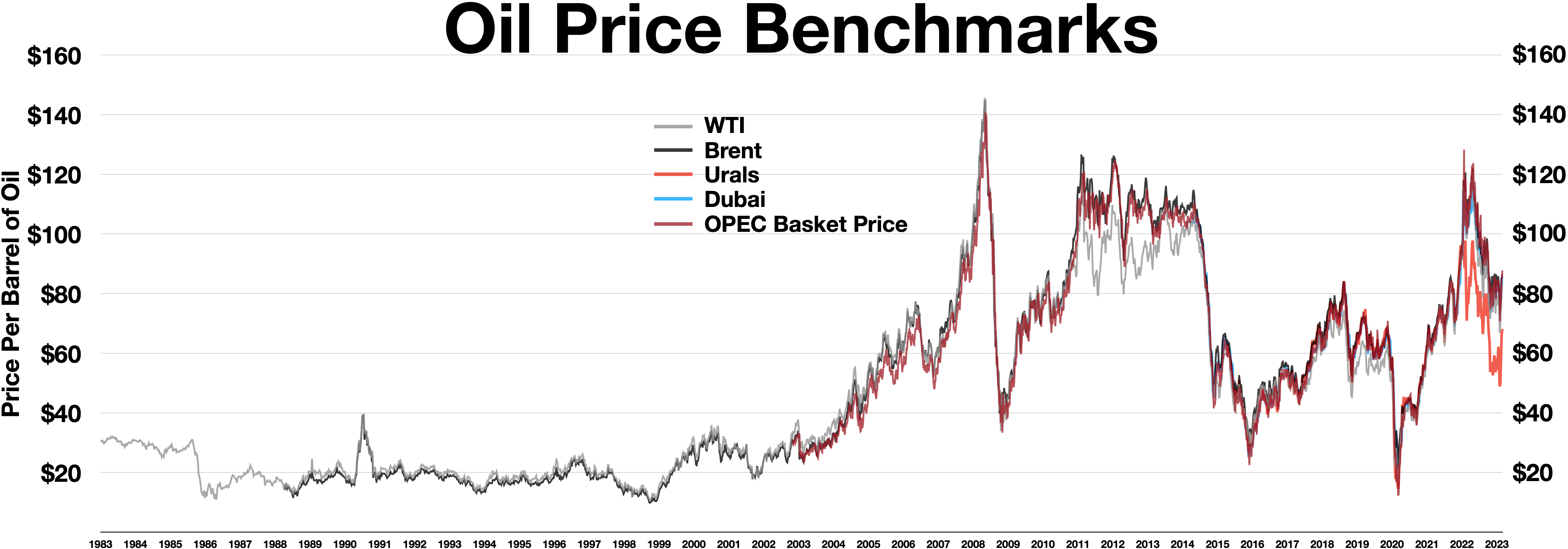
The price of oil from 1983 to 2023 West Texas Intermediate Brent Crude Urals oil (Russian export mix) Dubai Crude OPEC Reference Basket

The price of oil, or the oil price, generally refers to the spot price of a barrel (42 U.S. gallons; 159 liters) of benchmark crude oil—a reference price for buyers and sellers of crude oil such as West Texas Intermediate (WTI), Brent Crude, Dubai Crude, OPEC Reference Basket, Tapis crude, Bonny Light, Urals oil, Isthmus, and Western Canadian Select (WCS) among others. Oil prices are determined by global supply and demand, rather than any country's domestic production level, although the Organization of the Petroleum Exporting Countries (OPEC) cartel increases oil prices.

=== Trade ===
Crude oil is traded as a future on both the NYMEX and ICE exchanges. Futures contracts are agreements in which buyers and sellers agree to purchase and deliver specific amounts of physical crude oil on a given date in the future. A contract covers any multiple of 1,000 barrels and can be purchased up to nine years into the future.

== Use by country ==
=== Consumption ===
In the 2021 US Energy Information Administration (EIA) estimate, the world consumes 97.26 million barrels of oil each day.

Per capita oil consumption

Oil consumption by country

This table orders the amount of petroleum consumed in 2011 in thousand barrels (1,000 bbl) per day and in thousand cubic metres (1,000 m^{3}) per day:

Consuming nation 2011	(1,000 bbl/ day)	(1,000 m^{3}/ day)	Population in millions	bbl/year per capita	m^{3}/year per capita	National production/ consumption
United States ^{1}	18,835.5	2,994.6	314	21.8	3.47	0.51
China	9,790.0	1,556.5	1345	2.7	0.43	0.41
Japan ^{2}	4,464.1	709.7	127	12.8	2.04	0.03
India ^{2}	3,292.2	523.4	1198	1	0.16	0.26
Russia ^{1}	3,145.1	500.0	140	8.1	1.29	3.35
Saudi Arabia (OPEC)	2,817.5	447.9	27	40	6.4	3.64
Brazil	2,594.2	412.4	193	4.9	0.78	0.99
Germany ^{2}	2,400.1	381.6	82	10.7	1.70	0.06
Canada	2,259.1	359.2	33	24.6	3.91	1.54
South Korea ^{2}	2,230.2	354.6	48	16.8	2.67	0.02
Mexico ^{1}	2,132.7	339.1	109	7.1	1.13	1.39
France ^{2}	1,791.5	284.8	62	10.5	1.67	0.03
Iran (OPEC)	1,694.4	269.4	74	8.3	1.32	2.54
United Kingdom ^{1}	1,607.9	255.6	61	9.5	1.51	0.93
Italy ^{2}	1,453.6	231.1	60	8.9	1.41	0.10

Source: US Energy Information Administration

Population Data:

^{1} peak production of oil already passed in this state

^{2} This country is not a major oil producer

Global fossil carbon emissions, an indicator of consumption, from 1800 to 2010.
Total
Oil

The rate of world energy usage per year from 1970 to 2017.

Daily oil consumption from 1980 to 2006.

Oil consumption by percentage of total per region from 1980 to 2006:
US
Europe
Asia and Oceania
.

Oil consumption 1980 to 2007 by region.

=== Production ===
Oil production by country

Oil production per capita

Top oil-producing countries from 1973 to 2018. View source data.

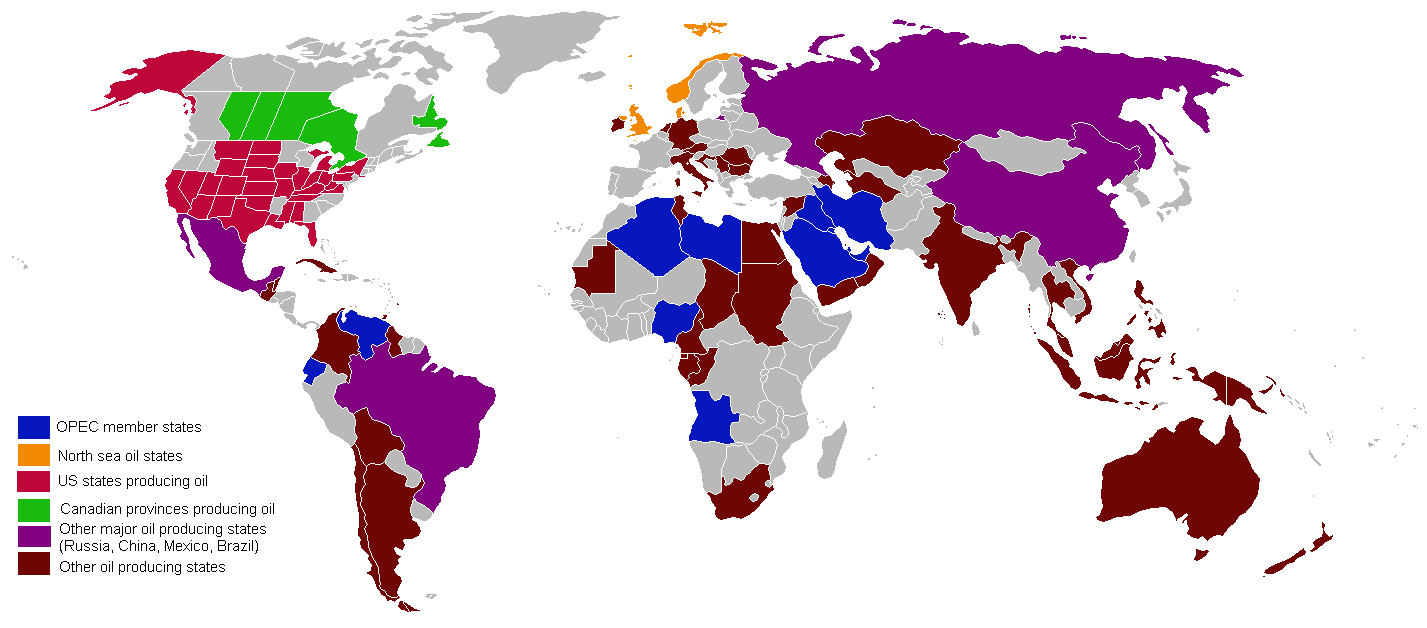
World map with countries by oil production from 2006 to 2012

In petroleum industry parlance, production refers to the quantity of crude extracted from reserves, not the literal creation of the product.

	Country	Oil Production (bbl/day, 2016)
1	Russia	10,551,497
2	Saudi Arabia (OPEC)	10,460,710
3	United States	8,875,817
4	Iraq (OPEC)	4,451,516
5	Iran (OPEC)	3,990,956
6	China, People's Republic of	3,980,650
7	Canada	3,662,694
8	United Arab Emirates (OPEC)	3,106,077
9	Kuwait (OPEC)	2,923,825
10	Brazil	2,515,459
11	Venezuela (OPEC)	2,276,967
12	Mexico	2,186,877
13	Nigeria (OPEC)	1,999,885
14	Angola (OPEC)	1,769,615
15	Norway	1,647,975
16	Kazakhstan	1,595,199
17	Qatar (OPEC)	1,522,902
18	Algeria (OPEC)	1,348,361
19	Oman	1,006,841
20	United Kingdom	939,760

=== Exportation ===
In order of net exports in 2011, 2009 and 2006 in thousand bbl/d and thousand m^{3}/d:

#	Exporting nation	10^{3}bbl/d (2011)	10^{3}m^{3}/d (2011)	10^{3}bbl/d (2009)	10^{3}m^{3}/d (2009)	10^{3}bbl/d (2006)	10^{3}m^{3}/d (2006)
1	Saudi Arabia (OPEC)	8,336	1,325	7,322	1,164	8,651	1,376
2	Russia ^{1}	7,083	1,126	7,194	1,144	6,565	1,044
3	Iran (OPEC)	2,540	403	2,486	395	2,519	401
4	United Arab Emirates (OPEC)	2,524	401	2,303	366	2,515	400
5	Kuwait (OPEC)	2,343	373	2,124	338	2,150	342
6	Nigeria (OPEC)	2,257	359	1,939	308	2,146	341
7	Iraq (OPEC)	1,915	304	1,764	280	1,438	229
8	Angola (OPEC)	1,760	280	1,878	299	1,363	217
9	Norway ^{1}	1,752	279	2,132	339	2,542	404
10	Venezuela (OPEC) ^{1}	1,715	273	1,748	278	2,203	350
11	Algeria (OPEC) ^{1}	1,568	249	1,767	281	1,847	297
12	Qatar (OPEC)	1,468	233	1,066	169	–	–
13	Canada ^{2}	1,405	223	1,168	187	1,071	170
14	Kazakhstan	1,396	222	1,299	207	1,114	177
15	Azerbaijan ^{1}	836	133	912	145	532	85
16	Trinidad and Tobago ^{1}	177	112	167	160	155	199

Source: US Energy Information Administration

^{1} peak production already passed in this state

^{2} Canadian statistics are complicated by the fact it is both an importer and exporter of crude oil, and refines large amounts of oil for the U.S. market. It is the leading source of U.S. imports of oil and products, averaging 2,500,000 bbl/d (400,000 m^{3}/d) in August 2007.

Total world production/consumption (as of 2005) is approximately 84 million barrels per day (13,400,000 m^{3}/d).

=== Importation ===
In order of net imports in 2011, 2009 and 2006 in thousand bbl/d and thousand m^{3}/d:

#	Importing nation	10^{3}bbl/day (2011)	10^{3}m^{3}/day (2011)	10^{3}bbl/day (2009)	10^{3}m^{3}/day (2009)	10^{3}bbl/day (2006)	10^{3}m^{3}/day (2006)
1	United States ^{1}	8,728	1,388	9,631	1,531	12,220	1,943
2	China	5,487	872	4,328	688	3,438	547
3	Japan	4,329	688	4,235	673	5,097	810
4	India	2,349	373	2,233	355	1,687	268
5	Germany	2,235	355	2,323	369	2,483	395
6	South Korea	2,170	345	2,139	340	2,150	342
7	France	1,697	270	1,749	278	1,893	301
8	Spain	1,346	214	1,439	229	1,555	247
9	Italy	1,292	205	1,381	220	1,558	248
10	Singapore	1,172	186	916	146	787	125
11	Republic of China (Taiwan)	1,009	160	944	150	942	150
12	Netherlands	948	151	973	155	936	149
13	Turkey	650	103	650	103	576	92
14	Belgium	634	101	597	95	546	87
15	Thailand	592	94	538	86	606	96

Source: US Energy Information Administration

^{1} peak production of oil expected in 2020

=== Non-producing consumers ===
Countries whose oil production is 10% or less of their consumption.

#	Consuming nation	(bbl/day)	(m^{3}/day)
1	Japan	5,578,000	886,831
2	Germany	2,677,000	425,609
3	South Korea	2,061,000	327,673
4	France	2,060,000	327,514
5	Italy	1,874,000	297,942
6	Spain	1,537,000	244,363
7	Netherlands	946,700	150,513
8	Turkey	575,011	91,663

Source: CIA World Factbook

== Environmental effects ==
=== Climate ===
Seawater acidification

As of 2018, about a quarter of annual global greenhouse gas emissions is the carbon dioxide from burning petroleum (plus methane leaks from the industry). (Note: 12.4 gigatonnes petroleum (and about 1 Gt CO_{2} eq from methane)/50 gigatonnes total) Along with the burning of coal, petroleum combustion is the largest contributor to the increase in atmospheric CO_{2}. Atmospheric CO_{2} has risen over the last 150 years to current levels of over 415 ppmv, from the 180–300 ppmv of the prior 800 thousand years. The rise in Arctic temperature has reduced the minimum Arctic ice pack to 4,320,000 km^{2} (1,670,000 sq mi), a loss of almost half since satellite measurements started in 1979.

Ocean acidification is the increase in the acidity of the Earth's oceans caused by the uptake of CO_{2} from the atmosphere.The saturation state of calcium carbonate decreases with the uptake of carbon dioxide in the ocean. This increase in acidity inhibits all marine life—having a greater effect on smaller organisms as well as shelled organisms such as Pectinoidea.

=== Extraction ===
Oil extraction is simply the removal of oil from the reservoir (oil pool). There are many methods of extracting the oil from the reservoirs for example; mechanical shaking, water-in-oil emulsion, and specialty chemicals called demulsifiers that separate the oil from water. Oil extraction is costly and often environmentally damaging. Offshore exploration and extraction of oil disturb the surrounding marine environment.

=== Oil spills ===
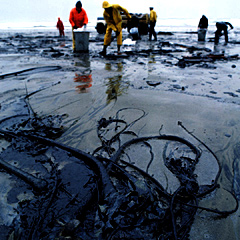
Kelp after an oil spill

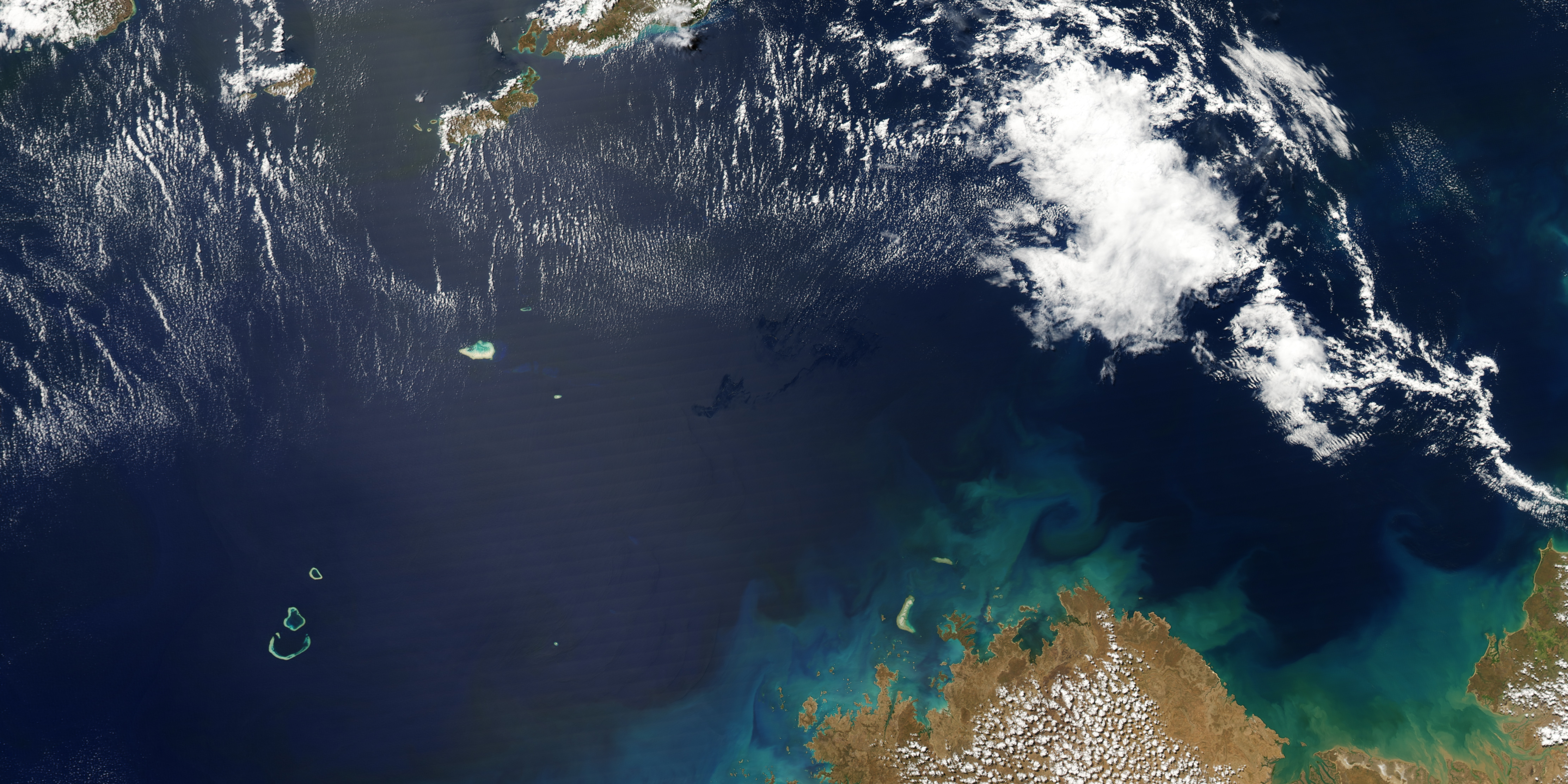
Oil slick from the Montara oil spill in the Timor Sea, September 2009

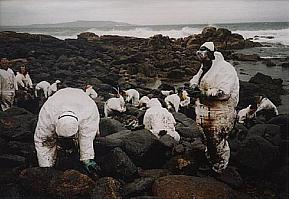
Volunteers cleaning up the aftermath of the Prestige oil spill

Crude oil and refined fuel spills from tanker ship accidents have damaged natural ecosystems and human livelihoods in Alaska, the Gulf of Mexico, the Galápagos Islands, France and many other places. The quantity of oil spilled during accidents has ranged from a few hundred tons to several hundred thousand tons (e.g., Deepwater Horizon oil spill, SS Atlantic Empress, Amoco Cadiz). Smaller spills have already proven to have a great impact on ecosystems, such as the Exxon Valdez oil spill.

Oil spills at sea are generally much more damaging than those on land, since they can spread for hundreds of square miles in a thin oil slick which can cover beaches with a thin coating of oil. This can kill sea birds, mammals, shellfish, and other organisms it coats. Oil spills on land are more readily containable if a makeshift earth dam can be rapidly bulldozed around the spill site before most of the oil escapes, and land animals can avoid the oil more easily.

Control of oil spills is difficult, requiring ad hoc methods and often a large amount of manpower. The dropping of bombs and incendiary devices from aircraft on the SS Torrey Canyon wreck produced poor results; modern techniques would include pumping the oil from the wreck, like in the Prestige oil spill or the Erika oil spill.

Though crude oil is predominantly composed of various hydrocarbons, certain nitrogen heterocyclic compounds, such as pyridine, picoline, and quinoline are reported as contaminants associated with crude oil, as well as facilities processing oil shale or coal and have also been found at legacy wood treatment sites. These compounds have a very high water solubility and thus tend to dissolve and move with water. Certain naturally occurring bacteria such as Micrococcus, Arthrobacter, and Rhodococcus have been shown to degrade these contaminants.

Because petroleum is a naturally occurring substance, its presence in the environment is not necessarily the result of human causes such as accidents and routine activities (seismic exploration, drilling, extraction, refining and combustion). Phenomena such as seeps and tar pits are examples of areas that petroleum affects without human involvement.

=== Tarballs ===
A tarball is a blob of crude oil (not to be confused with tar, which is a human-made product derived from pine trees or refined from petroleum) which has been weathered after floating in the ocean. Tarballs are an aquatic pollutant in most environments, although they can occur naturally, for example in the Santa Barbara Channel of California or in the Gulf of Mexico off Texas. Their concentration and features have been used to assess the extent of oil spills. Their composition can be used to identify their sources of origin, and tarballs may be dispersed over long distances by deep sea currents. They are slowly decomposed by bacteria, including Chromobacterium violaceum, Cladosporium resinae, Bacillus submarinus, Micrococcus varians, Pseudomonas aeruginosa, Candida marina and Saccharomyces estuari.

=== Whales ===
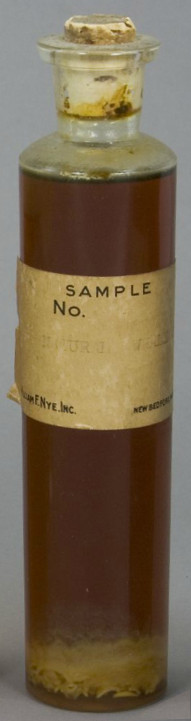
A bottle of unrefined whale oil

James S. Robbins has argued that the advent of petroleum-refined kerosene saved some species of great whales from extinction by providing an inexpensive substitute for whale oil, thus eliminating the economic imperative for open-boat whaling, but others say that fossil fuels increased whaling with most whales being killed in the 20th century.

== Alternatives ==
In 2018 road transport used 49% of petroleum, aviation 8%, and uses other than energy 17%. Electric vehicles are the main alternative for road transport and biojet for aviation. Single-use plastics have a high carbon footprint and may pollute the sea, but as of 2022 the best alternatives are unclear.

== International relations ==
Control of petroleum production has been a significant driver of international relations during much of the 20th and 21st centuries. Organizations like OPEC have played an outsized role in international politics. Some historians and commentators have called this the "Age of Oil" With the rise of renewable energy and addressing climate change some commentators expect a realignment of international power away from petrostates.

=== Corruption ===
"Oil rents" have been described as connected with corruption in political literature. A 2011 study suggests that increases in oil rents increased corruption in countries with heavy government involvement in the production of oil. The study found that increases in oil rents "significantly deteriorates political rights". The investigators say that oil exploitation gave politicians "an incentive to extend civil liberties but reduce political rights in the presence of oil windfalls to evade redistribution and conflict".

=== Conflict ===
Petroleum production has been linked with conflict for many years, leading to thousands of deaths. Petroleum deposits are in very few countries around the world. Conflicts may start when countries refuse to cut oil production in which other countries respond to such actions by increasing their production causing a trade war as experienced during the 2020 Russia–Saudi Arabia oil price war. Other conflicts start with countries wanting petroleum resources or other reasons on oil resource territory experienced in the Iran–Iraq War.

=== OPEC ===
The Organization of the Petroleum Exporting Countries (OPEC /ˈoʊpɛk/ OH-pek) is an intergovernmental cartel enabling the co-operation of leading oil-producing and oil-dependent countries in order to collectively influence the global oil market and maximize profit. It was founded on 14 September 1960 in Baghdad by the first five members: Iran, Iraq, Kuwait, Saudi Arabia and Venezuela. The organization, which currently comprises 11 member countries, accounted for 38 percent of global oil production in 2022. It is estimated that 79.5 percent of the world's proven oil reserves are located within OPEC nations, with the Middle East alone accounting for 67.2 percent of OPEC's total reserves.

In a series of steps in the 1960s and 1970s, OPEC restructured the global system of oil production in favor of oil-producing states and away from an oligopoly of dominant Anglo-American oil firms, the "Seven Sisters". In the 1970s, restrictions in oil production led to a dramatic rise in oil prices with long-lasting and far-reaching consequences for the global economy. Since the 1980s, OPEC has had a limited impact on world oil-supply and oil-price stability, as there is frequent cheating by members on their commitments to one another, and as member commitments reflect what they would do even in the absence of OPEC.

The formation of OPEC marked a turning point toward national sovereignty over natural resources. OPEC decisions have come to play a prominent role in the global oil market and in international relations. Economists have characterized OPEC as a textbook example of a cartel, a group whose members cooperate to reduce market competition and obtain monopoly profits.

The current OPEC members are Algeria, Equatorial Guinea, Gabon, Iran, Iraq, Kuwait, Libya, Nigeria, the Republic of the Congo, Saudi Arabia, and Venezuela. The former members are Angola, Ecuador, Indonesia, Qatar, and the United Arab Emirates. OPEC+ is a larger group consisting of OPEC members and other oil-producing countries. It was formed in late 2016 to better control the global crude oil market. Canada, Egypt, Norway, and Oman have attended some meetings as observers. The United Arab Emirates left both OPEC and OPEC+ in 2026.

== Future production ==
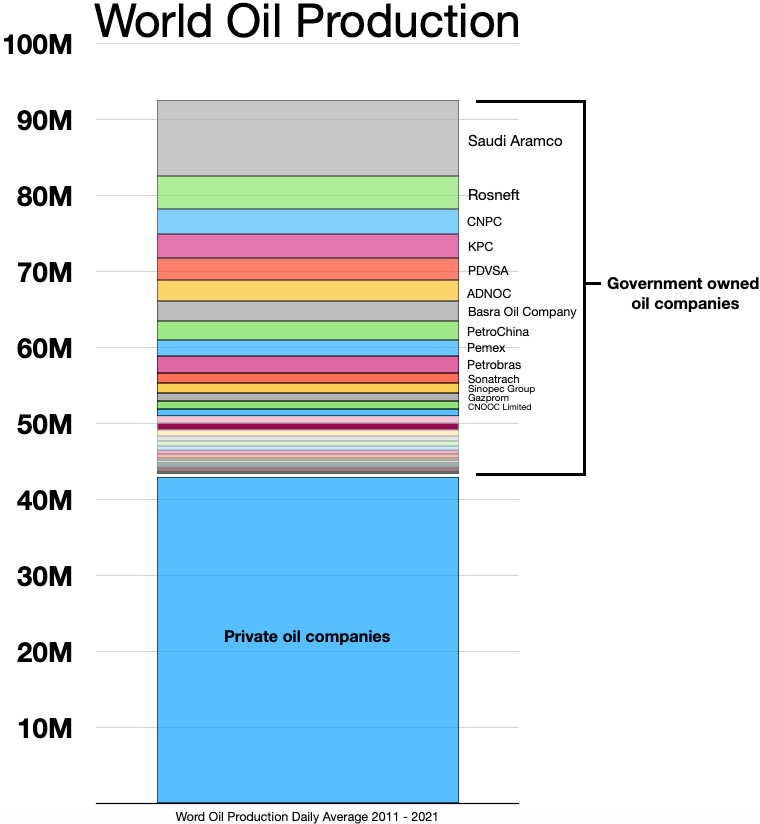
World oil production by average barrels per day between 2011 and 2022

Consumption in the 20th and 21st centuries has been abundantly pushed by automobile sector growth. The 1985–2003 oil glut even fueled the sales of low fuel economy vehicles in OECD countries. The 2008 economic crisis seems to have had some impact on the sales of such vehicles; still, in 2008 oil consumption showed a small increase.

In 2016 Goldman Sachs predicted lower demand for oil due to emerging economies concerns, especially China. The BRICS (Brasil, Russia, India, China, South Africa) countries might also kick in, as China briefly had the largest automobile market in December 2009. In the long term, uncertainties linger; the OPEC believes that the OECD countries will push low consumption policies at some point in the future; when that happens, it will definitely curb oil sales, and both OPEC and the Energy Information Administration kept lowering their 2020 consumption estimates during the past five years. A detailed review of International Energy Agency oil projections have revealed that revisions of world oil production, price and investments have been motivated by a combination of demand and supply factors. All together, non-OPEC conventional projections have been fairly stable the last 15 years, while downward revisions were mainly allocated to OPEC. Upward revisions are primarily a result of US tight oil.

Production will also face an increasingly complex situation; while OPEC countries still have large reserves at low production prices, newly found reservoirs often lead to higher prices; offshore giants such as Tupi, Guara and Tiber demand high investments and ever-increasing technological abilities. Subsalt reservoirs such as Tupi were unknown in the 20th century, mainly because the industry was unable to probe them. Enhanced oil recovery techniques such as those used at the Daqing Oil Field will continue to play a major role in increasing the world's recoverable oil.

The expected availability of petroleum resources has always been around 35 years or even less since the start of the modern exploration. The oil constant, an insider pun in the German industry, refers to that effect. A growing number of divestment campaigns from major funds pushed by newer generations who question the sustainability of petroleum may hinder the financing of future oil prospection and production.

=== Peak oil ===
Peak oil is a term applied to the projection that future petroleum production, whether for individual oil wells, entire oil fields, whole countries, or worldwide production, will eventually peak and then decline at a similar rate to the rate of increase before the peak as these reserves are exhausted. The peak of oil discoveries was in 1965, and oil production per year has surpassed oil discoveries every year since 1980.

Lack of knowledge and/or transparency in the accounting of global oil reserves makes it difficult to predict the oil peak in any given region. Based on available production data, proponents have previously predicted the peak for the world in 1989, 1995, or 1995–2000. Some of these predictions date from before the recession of the early 1980s and the consequent lowering in global consumption, the effect of which was to delay the date of any peak by several years. Just as the 1971 U.S. peak in oil production was only clearly recognized after the fact, a peak in world production will be difficult to discern until production clearly drops off. In 2020, according to BP's Energy Outlook 2020, peak oil had been reached, due to the changing energy landscape coupled with the economic toll of the COVID-19 pandemic.

While there has been much focus historically on peak oil supply, the focus is increasingly shifting to peak demand as more countries seek to transition to renewable energy. The GeGaLo index of geopolitical gains and losses assesses how the geopolitical position of 156 countries may change if the world fully transitions to renewable energy resources. Former oil exporters are expected to lose power, while the positions of former oil importers and countries rich in renewable energy resources is expected to strengthen.

=== Unconventional oil ===
The calculus for peak oil has changed with the introduction of unconventional production methods. In particular, the combination of horizontal drilling and hydraulic fracturing has resulted in a significant increase in production from previously uneconomic plays. Certain rock strata contain hydrocarbons but have low permeability and are not thick from a vertical perspective. Conventional vertical wells would be unable to economically retrieve these hydrocarbons. Horizontal drilling, extending horizontally through the strata, permits the well to access a much greater volume of the strata. Hydraulic fracturing creates greater permeability and increases hydrocarbon flow to the wellbore.

== Hydrocarbons on other worlds ==
On Saturn's largest moon, Titan, lakes of liquid hydrocarbons comprising methane, ethane, propane and other constituents occur naturally. Data collected by the space probe Cassini–Huygens yield an estimate that the visible lakes and seas of Titan contain about 300 times the volume of Earth's proven oil reserves. Drilled samples from the surface of Mars taken in 2015 by the Curiosity rover's Mars Science Laboratory have found organic molecules of benzene and propane in 3-billion-year-old rock samples in Gale Crater.

== In fiction ==
Petrofiction or oil fiction is a genre of fiction focused on the role of petroleum in society.

== See also ==
- Barrel of oil equivalent – Unit of energy
- Filling station – Facility that sells gasoline and diesel
- Gas/oil ratio – Measurement in oil production
- Heavy metals – Term used for certain metallic elements
- International Safety Guide for Oil Tankers and Terminals – Code of practice first published in 1978
- Lead poisoning – Poisoning caused by lead in the body
- List of oil exploration and production companies
- List of oil fields – Some of the major oilfields of the past and present
- Manure-derived synthetic crude oil – Synthetic bio-oil converted from manure
- Oil burden – Economic statistic
- Oil reserves in France
- Petroleum geology – Field in geology
- Petroleum politics
- Petrocurrency – Financial asset backed by a country's revenues from petroleum exports
- Thermal depolymerization – Process for breaking-down polymers
- Total petroleum hydrocarbon – Total concentration of petroleum-derived hydrocarbons in environmental samples
- Waste oil – Unsuitable petroleum-based or synthetic oil
- Unconventional (oil and gas) reservoir – Type of hydrocarbon reservoir
