= Deepwater Horizon =

Former offshore oil drilling rig

- Deepwater Horizon semi-submersible drilling rig

History
- Name: Deepwater Horizon
- Owner: Transocean's Triton Asset Leasing
- Operator: BP
- Port of registry: Panama (23 February 2001 – 28 December 2004); Majuro (29 December 2004)
- Route: Gulf of Mexico
- Ordered: December 1998
- Builder: Hyundai Heavy Industries
- Cost: US$560 million
- Way number: 89
- Laid down: 21 March 2000
- Completed: 2001
- Acquired: 23 February 2001
- Maiden voyage: Long Beach, California – Freeport, Texas
- Out of service: 22 April 2010
- Identification: ABS class no.: 0139290; IMO number: 8764597; MMSI no.: 538002213
- Fate: Sank on 22 April 2010 (Earth Day), after an explosion and fire
- Notes: Located in the Gulf of Mexico at a depth of 5,000 ft (1,500 m) at 28°44′30″N 88°23′03″W

General characteristics
- Class & type: ABS +A1 DPS-3 Column Stabilized MODU
- Displacement: 52.587 Mg
- Length: 112 m
- Beam: 78 m
- Height: 97.5 m
- Draught: 23 m (75 ft)
- Depth: 41.5 m (136 ft)
- Deck clearance: 34.010 m (111.58 ft)
- Installed power: 7 MW 11 kV; 6 × Wärtsilä 18V32 7.2 MW diesel engines; 6 × ABB AMG 0900xU10 AC generators
- Propulsion: 8 × Kamewa 5.5 MW, 6.3 rad fixed-propeller azimuth thrusters
- Speed: 2 m/s
- Capacity: Liquid mud: 700 m^{3}; Drill water: 2100 m^{3}; Potable water: 1200 m^{3}; Fuel oil: 4500 m^{3}; Bulk mud: 400 m^{3}; Bulk cement: 250 m^{3}
- Crew: 150

Deepwater Horizon was a dynamically positioned, ultra-deepwater, semi-submersible offshore drilling rig owned by Transocean and operated by the BP company. On 20 April 2010, while drilling in the Gulf of Mexico at the Macondo Prospect, a blowout caused an explosion on the rig that killed 11 people and ignited a fireball visible from 40 miles (64 km) away. The fire was inextinguishable and, two days later, on 22 April, the Horizon collapsed, leaving the well gushing at the seabed and becoming the largest marine oil spill in history.

Built in 2001 in South Korea by Hyundai Heavy Industries, the rig was commissioned by R&B Falcon (a later asset of Transocean), registered in Majuro, and under lease to BP from 2001 until September 2013. In September 2009, the rig drilled the deepest oil well in history at a vertical depth of 35,050 ft (10,683 m) and measured depth of 35,055 ft (10,685 m) in the Tiber Oil Field at Keathley Canyon block 102, approximately 250 miles (400 km) southeast of Houston, in 4,132 feet (1,259 m) of water.

== Design ==
Deepwater Nautilus, a sister rig of Deepwater Horizon, being transported by MV Black Marlin.

Deepwater Horizon was a fifth-generation, RBS-8D design (i.e. model type), deepwater, dynamically positioned, column-stabilized, semi-submersible mobile offshore drilling unit, designed to drill subsea wells for oil exploration and production using an 18.75 in (476 mm), 15,000 psi (100,000 kPa) blowout preventer, and a 21 in (530 mm) outside diameter marine riser.

Deepwater Horizon was the second semi-submersible rig constructed of a class of two, although Deepwater Nautilus, its predecessor, is not dynamically positioned. The rig was 396 by 256 ft (121 by 78 m) and capable of operating in waters as deep as 8,000 feet (2,400 m), to a maximum drill depth of 30,000 ft (9,100 m). In 2010, it was one of approximately 200 deepwater offshore rigs capable of drilling in waters deeper than 5,000 ft (1,500 m). Its American Bureau of Shipping (ABS) class notations were "A1, Column Stabilized Drilling Unit, AMS, ACCU, DPS-3".

In 2002, the rig was upgraded with "e-drill", a drill monitoring system whereby technical personnel based in Houston, Texas, received real-time drilling data from the rig and transmitted maintenance and troubleshooting information.

Advanced systems had a major role in the rig's operation, from pressure and drill monitoring technology, to automated shutoff systems and modelling systems for cementing. The OptiCem cement modelling system, used by Halliburton in April 2010, played a crucial part in cement slurry mix and support decisions. These decisions became a focus for investigations of the explosion on the rig that month.

== History ==
=== Construction and ownership ===
Deepwater Horizon was built for R&B Falcon (which later became part of Transocean) by Hyundai Heavy Industries in Ulsan, South Korea. Construction started in December 1998, the keel was laid on 21 March 2000, and the rig was delivered on 23 February 2001, after the acquisition of R&B Falcon by Transocean. Until 29 December 2004, the rig was registered in the Republic of Panama.

Transocean, through its Steinhausen, Switzerland, subsidiary Triton Asset Leasing GmbH, operated the rig under the flag of convenience of the Marshall Islands. The rig was leased to BP by a three-year contract for deployment in the Gulf of Mexico after construction. The lease was renewed in 2004 for a year, 2005 for five years, and 2009 for three years covering 2010 to 2013. The last contract was worth $544 million, or $496,800 a day, for a "bare rig", with crew, gear and support vessels estimated to cost the same.

According to R&B Falcon's filings to SEC in 2001, the transfer document between R&B Falcon and Transocean was dated 17 August 2001, and the rig was specified as "official registration number of 29273-PEXT-1, IMO number of 8764597, with gross tonnage of 32,588 and net tonnage of 9,778" and the transfer value as US$340 million. As of 2010, the rig was insured for US$560 million covering the replacement cost and wreckage removal.

=== Drilling operations ===
Deepwater Horizon worked on wells in the Atlantis (BP 56%, BHP 44%) and Thunder Horse (BP 75%, ExxonMobil 25%) oil fields. It was described at times as a "lucky" and "celebrated" rig, and in 2007 was still described as "one of the most powerful rigs in the world". In 2006, it discovered oil in the Kaskida oil field and, in 2009, the "giant" Tiber oil field. The well in the Tiber field had a true vertical depth of 35,050 ft (10,683 m) and a measured depth of 35,055 ft (10,685 m), below 4,132 ft (1,259 m) of water. The well was the deepest oil well in the world and more than 5,000 feet (1,500 m) farther below the seabed than the rig's official drilling specification stated on the company's fleet list.

In February 2010, Deepwater Horizon commenced drilling an exploratory well at the Macondo Prospect (Mississippi Canyon Block 252), about 41 miles (66 km) off the southeast coast of Louisiana, at a water depth of approximately 5,000 feet (1,500 m). The Macondo prospect exploration rights had been acquired by BP in 2009, with the prospect jointly owned by BP (65%), Anadarko Petroleum (25%) and MOEX Offshore 2007 (10%). Deepwater Horizon was still working on the Macondo site on 20 April 2010, when a violent explosion occurred resulting in destruction of the rig and the subsequent oil spill. This oil spill has been recorded as the largest offshore spill to occur to date, resulting in 40 miles (64 km) of coastal pollution. The well was in the final stages of completion after cement had been emplaced for its last casing string. The exploratory work had been described as "concluded" with permission having been requested already from the U.S. Minerals Management Service (MMS) to terminate operations at the Macondo site. The rig was scheduled to move to its next roles as semi-permanent production platforms, initially at the Tiber site followed by a return to the Kaskida field, an oil dome 50 miles off the coast of Louisiana.

During its operational lifetime, the rig was actively in operation for 93% of the time it was in service (2,896 of 3,131 days). The remainder partly was time spent moving between sites.

=== Regulation, safety, and inspection ===
The Minerals Management Service (renamed on 18 June 2010, to the Bureau of Ocean Energy Management, Regulation and Enforcement, or Bureau of Ocean Energy (BOE)) is the regulatory and inspecting body for offshore oil drilling and rigs in the United States of America. According to an Associated Press investigation, certain safety documentation and emergency procedure information, including documentation for the exact incident that later occurred, was absent. The exact number of required monthly inspections performed varied over time; the inspections were performed as required for the first 40 months, but after that, about 25% of inspections were omitted, although the investigation notes this is partly expected, since there are circumstances such as weather and movement which preclude an inspection. Reports of the last three inspections for 2010 were provided by Freedom of Information legislation. Each of these inspections had taken two hours or less.

During its lifetime, the rig received five citations for noncompliance, four of which were in 2002 (safety, including the blowout preventer) and the other in 2003 (pollution). A sixth citation in 2007 related to non-grounded electrical equipment was later withdrawn when the equipment was determined to be compliant with regulations. Overall, the Deepwater Horizon's safety record was "strong" according to a drilling consultant reviewing the information. In 2009, the Minerals Management Service "herald[ed] the Deepwater Horizon as an industry model for safety". According to AP's investigation, "its record was so exemplary, according to MMS officials, that the rig was never on inspectors' informal 'watch list' for problem rigs".

== Explosion and oil spill ==
Deepwater Horizon in flames after the explosion

Location of the Deepwater Horizon on 20 April 2010

At 7:45 p.m. CDT on 20 April 2010, during the final phases of drilling the exploratory well off the gulf of Mexico, a geyser of seawater erupted from the marine riser onto the rig, shooting 70 metres (230 ft) into the air. This was followed soon by the eruption of a slushy combination of drilling mud, methane gas, and water. The gas component of the slushy material quickly transitioned into a fully gaseous state and then ignited into a series of explosions and then a firestorm. An attempt was made to activate the blowout preventer, but it failed. The final defense to prevent an oil spill, a device known as a blind shear ram, was activated but failed to plug the well.

Ten workers were presumed killed by the initial explosion:

- Jason Anderson, 35, of Midfield, Texas;
- Donald Clark, 49, of Newellton, Louisiana;
- Stephen Ray Curtis, 40, of Georgetown, Louisiana;
- Gordon Jones, 28, of Baton Rouge, Louisiana;
- Roy Wyatt Kemp, 27, of Jonesville, Louisiana;
- Karl Kleppinger Jr., 38, of Natchez, Mississippi;
- Keith Blair Manuel, 56, of Gonzales, Louisiana;
- Dewey Revette, 48, of State Line, Mississippi;
- Shane Roshto, 22, of Liberty, Mississippi;
- Adam Weise, 24, of Yorktown, Texas.

An eleventh worker also died in the subsequent fire, a crane operator:

- Aaron Dale Burkeen, 37, of Philadelphia, Mississippi.

115 workers survived with 17 injured.

The rig was evacuated, with injured workers airlifted to medical facilities. After approximately 36 hours, Deepwater Horizon sank on 22 April 2010. The remains of the rig were located resting on the seafloor approximately 1,500 metres (4,900 ft) deep at that location, and about 400 metres (1,300 ft) northwest of the well.

The resultant oil spill continued until 15 July when it was closed by a cap. Relief wells were used to permanently seal the well, which was declared "effectively dead" on 19 September 2010. NOAA established the Gulf Spill Restoration project, administered by the Deep Water Horizon National Resource Damage Assessment Trustees, to help to restore much of the coastline.

== Aftermath ==
Transocean received an early partial insurance settlement for total loss of the Deepwater Horizon of US$401 million about 5 May 2010. Financial analysts noted that the insurance recovery was likely to be more than the value of the rig (although not necessarily its replacement value) and any liabilities – the latter estimated at as much as US$200 million.

Litigation, ultimate assessment of damage, and the scope of final insurance recovery were all unknown as of June 2010, with analysts reporting that the aftermath was of unprecedented scale and complexity compared to previous disasters which themselves took many years to resolve. A July 2010 analysis by the Financial Times of the aftermath cited legal sources as saying that "at some point the scale of the litigation becomes so large that it really is novel", that "the situation is likely to be complicated further because the variety of probable cases means it will be hard to aggregate them into so-called class actions" and that there was "no way to put this in historical context because we have never faced anything like this before". As with the Exxon Valdez disaster, litigation was being discussed in terms of a 20-year timescale.

In January 2013, Transocean agreed to pay US$1.4 billion for violations of the U.S. Clean Water Act. BP had earlier agreed to pay $2.4 billion but was liable to additional penalties that could range from $5 billion to $20 billion. In September 2014, Halliburton agreed to settle a large percentage of legal claims against them by paying $1.1 billion into a trust by way of three installments during two years. On 4 September 2014, U.S. District Judge Carl Barbier ruled that BP was guilty of gross negligence and willful misconduct by the Clean Water Act (CWA). He described BP's actions as "reckless", while he said Transocean's and Halliburton's actions were "negligent". He apportioned 67% of the blame for the spill to BP, 30% to Transocean, and 3% to Halliburton. BP issued a statement strongly disagreeing with the finding, and saying the court's decision would be appealed.

On 8 December 2014, the U.S. Supreme Court rejected BP's legal challenge to a compensation deal for the 2010 Gulf of Mexico oil spill. The settlement agreement had no maximum, but BP initially estimated that it would pay about $7.8 billion to compensate victims. As of 2018, approximately 390,000 claims for compensations had been filed, with around $65 billion paid in settlements; thousands of claims were still outstanding.

The Deepwater Horizon oil spill is cited by lawyers, academics and journalists as an example of ecocide.

== Film ==
The biographical disaster film Deepwater Horizon, released in 2016, depicts the events of the 2010 Deepwater Horizon explosion and subsequent oil spill. The movie is based on "Deepwater Horizon's Final Hours", an article published in The New York Times.

== See also ==
- Ixtoc I oil spill
- Ocean Ranger
- Piper Alpha
- Tony Hayward
