= Oil constant =

The term crude oil constant (Erdölkonstante in German) has been used as an inside joke and pun in the German petroleum industry, pointing out that the reserves-to-production ratio has been observed as roughly constant in the past decades, whereas oil constant (Ölkonstante in German) is a term describing various material properties of (vegetable and mineral) oils.

== Reasons for reserve expansion ==
Reserves to production ratio of crude oil (static duration)

The so-called crude oil constant refers to the approximately constant estimate of available petroleum reserves to production ratio R/P. The estimated duration until the available petroleum reserves are depleted at current production has remained around 40 years since the late 80s. Prewar and immediately postwar estimates were sometimes lower, in 1919 as low as 9 years (USA) and in 1948 around 20 years (world) and rose up to 35 years until the 1970s. However, since then the duration value of static production T=R/P has been rather constant for decades despite rising oil consumption.

=== Price elasticity of reserves ===
One factor contributing to the apparent constancy of the R/P ratio is a neglect or misunderstanding of the fact that the term "proven reserves" does not refer to some absolute quantity of remaining oil that is thought to exist, but rather to the quantity of oil that can be economically extracted given the current price of oil and current oil-extraction technologies. Thus, either an increase in the price of oil or improvements in oil-extraction technologies can lead to an increase in the estimate of "proven reserves" since more-expensive-to-mine deposits such as tight oil become economically viable at a higher oil price, and because newer or more expensive enhanced oil recovery processes such as gas injection, steam injection, and hydraulic fracturing allow continued extraction of oil from fields that would have been considered worth to abandon at a lower price or using older technologies. Thus, it is possible for the "proven reserves of oil" (i.e., economically extractable reserves of oil) to keep pace with or even pull ahead of oil consumption at the current rate.

=== Unconventional oil ===
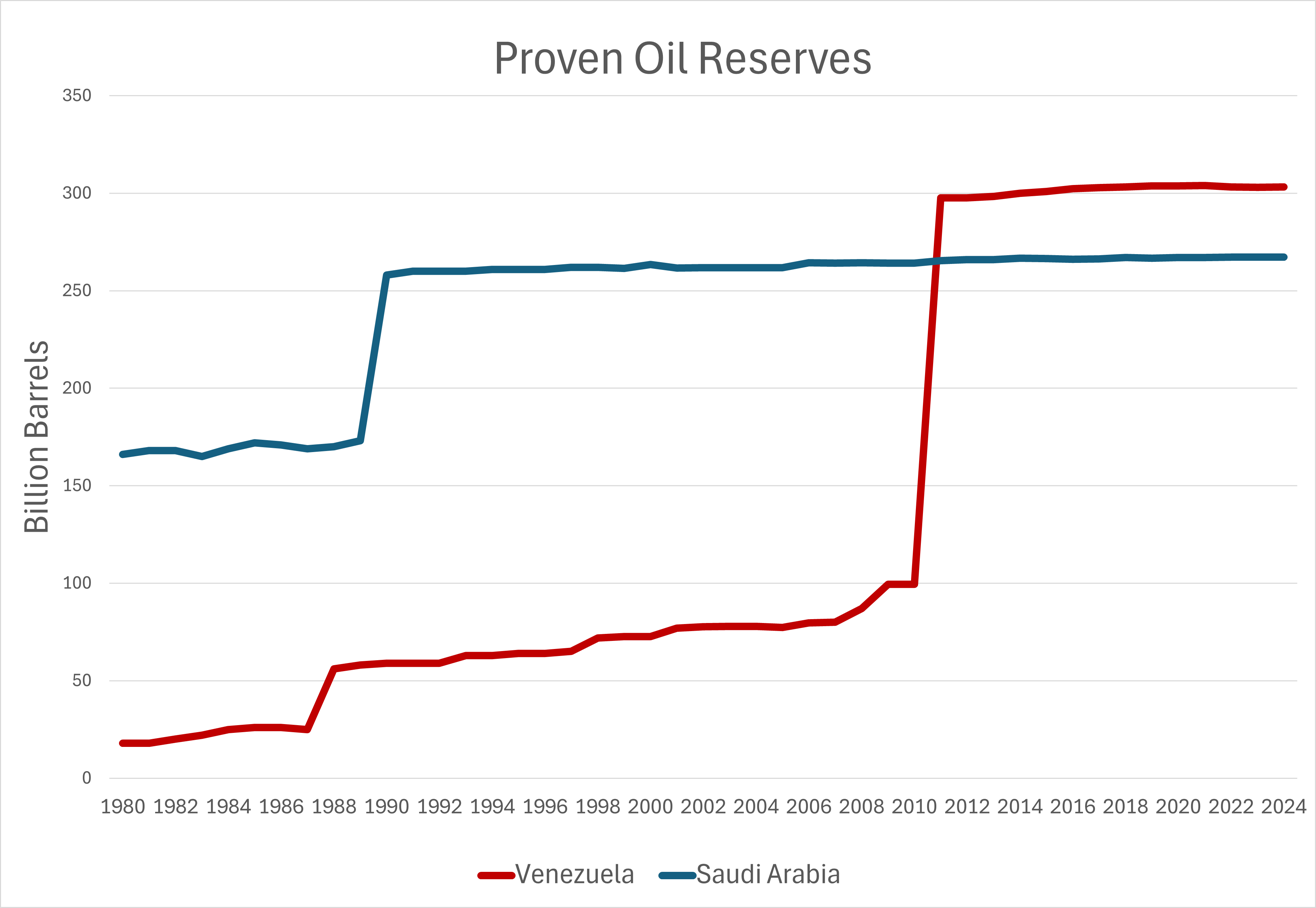
Oil reserves: Venezuela's extra heavy crude overtakes Saudi Arabia

On the other hand, the reserves to production ratio is only one mathematical indicator for the geological inventory. More important than the size of the tank is the production rate (e.g. the size of the spigot of a barrel), and with many capital-intensive technologies for extracting oil from non-conventional sources, also the flow rate is getting smaller. A large expansion of global reserves took place in the 2000s, when Athabasca oil sands (Canada) and the heavy oil of the Orinoco Belt (Venezuela) were reclassified from (physically in place) ressource to (producible) reserve. While the oil reserves are sizeable and in the same range as the reserves of Saudi Arabia, oil production is growing slowly in Canada and declining in Venezuela.

=== OPEC quota wars ===
Reserve expansion steps with OPEC members in the late 1980s

Another contributing factor for the steady P/R-ratio is the large expansion of OPEC reserves, that were booked in the years around 1988. The OPEC quota system had been amended, allowing a production which relates to the reported reserves. Within a few years, OPEC members raised their reserves on paper without reporting any major new discoveries.

=== SEC reporting rules ===
Oil companies which were listed at US stock exchanges or elsewhere are obliged to report their reserves on the principle of carefulness. This led to the effect that a new discovery was first reported by its lowest estimate (P90 = high confidence). Later, during production when the reservoir data became more detailed, the most likely estimate (P50) was reported but without backdating this reserve expansion to the year of the discovery. Enhanded oil recovery techniques made it possible to produce the P10 value (10% probability), but again the backdating was forgotten and it seemed as if new discoveries have been made.

== Analogous use ==
A similar pun has been used about the feasibility of fusion power: Since the 1950s, feasible technological means of using fusion for electricity production have constantly been predicted as being 30–40 years ahead, so the "fusion constant" exhibits a similar range to the "oil constant".
