= Alaminos Canyon =

Undersea canyon in the Gulf of Mexico

Coordinates: 26°30′N 94°35′W

Alaminos Canyon (the United States)

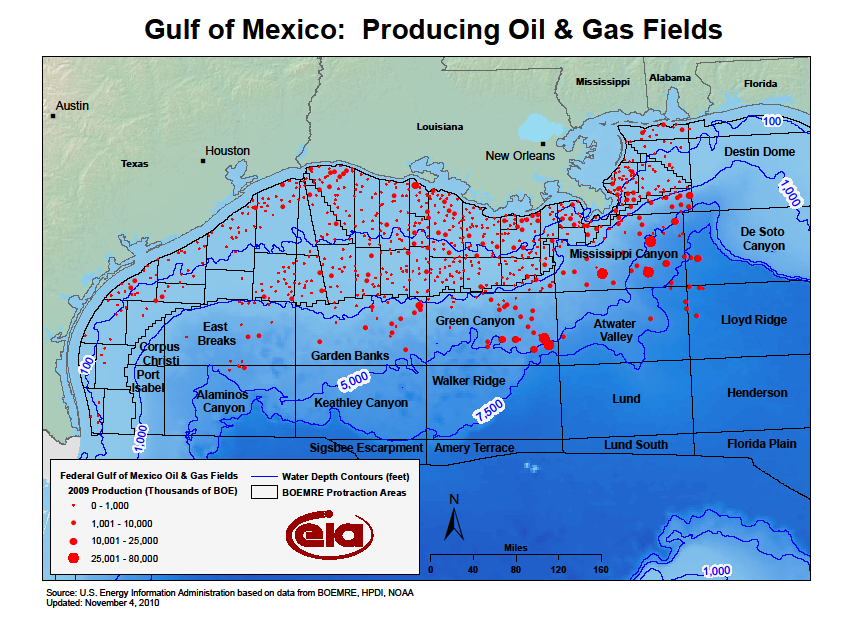
Off shore oil and gas fields in Gulf of Mexico. The Mississippi Canyon leasing area is delineated in the upper right, south of the Mississippi River outlet.

The Alaminos Canyon is an undersea canyon in the Western Gulf of Mexico, Southeast of the coast of Texas.

== Oil and gas exploration and production ==
According to "Deepwater Gulf of Mexico: America's Expanding Frontier", a report issued by the Minerals Management Service (MMS) Gulf of Mexico OCS Region, Alaminos Canyon is one of the deep-water discoveries in water depths greater than 7,000 ft (2,134 m), discovered in 2002.

A world record for deep drilling was set by ChevronTexaco in November 2003, drilling in 10,011 ft (3,051 m) (Toledo prospect in Alaminos Canyon Block 951). That record was set by Deepwater Nautilus, an ultra-deepwater, column-stabilized, semi-submersible mobile offshore drilling unit.

== See also ==
- Offshore oil and gas in the US Gulf of Mexico
