= Deepwater Nautilus =

Offshore drilling rig

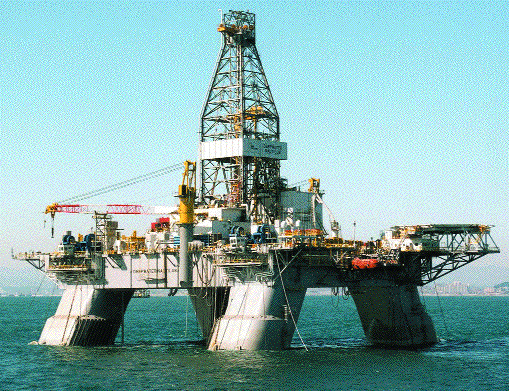

History
- Name: Deepwater Nautilus
- Owner: Triton Nautilus Asset Leasing GmbH, a subsidiary of Transocean
- Operator: Transocean
- Port of registry: Vanuatu
- Ordered: December 1998
- Builder: Hyundai Heavy Industries
- Way number: 89
- Laid down: January 15, 1999
- Completed: 2000
- Acquired: January 15, 2000
- Identification: ABS class no.: 0036567; Call sign: HP-9953; IMO number: 8764781
- Status: operational

General characteristics
- Class & type: ABS +A1 Column Stabilized CDS, P, PAS
- Tonnage: 29,051 GT; 8,715 NT
- Length: 114 m (374 ft)
- Beam: 78 m (256 ft)
- Draught: 23 m (75 ft)
- Depth: 41.5 m (136 ft)
- Installed power: 4 × Wärtsilä 12V32D 6300 hp diesel engines; 4 × ABB generators
- Capacity: Drill water: 3,142 m^{3} (111,000 cu ft); Potable water: 675 m^{3} (23,800 cu ft); Fuel oil: 4,293 m^{3} (151,600 cu ft); Bulk mud: 462 m^{3} (16,300 cu ft); Bulk cement: 231 m^{3} (8,200 cu ft)

Deepwater Nautilus is an ultra-deepwater, semi-submersible offshore drilling rig.

Built in 2000 in South Korea, she is owned by Transocean, registered in Vanuatu, and currently leased to Petronas at the rate of $140,000 per day for drilling operations in Malaysia.

== Description ==
Deepwater Nautilus is a fifth-generation, RBS-8M design, ultra-deepwater, column-stabilized, semi-submersible mobile offshore drilling unit, designed to drill subsea wells for oil exploration and production.

She was designed by Reading & Bates RBS-8M and built by Hyundai Heavy Industries in 2000 at the Ulsan shipyard in South Korea. Deepwater Nautilus can operate at water depths up to 8,000 feet (2,400 m) and has drilling depth down to 30,000 feet (9,100 m).

== History ==
=== Drilling ===
In 2000, Deepwater Nautilus set the world water-depth record for an offshore drilling rig operating in moored configuration at 7,785 feet (2,373 m) at the Alaminos Canyon block 557 in the United States sector of the Gulf of Mexico.

In 2002, Deepwater Nautilus discovered oil at the Shell-operated Great White oil field in Alaminos Canyon block 813.

On March 6, 2002, she drilled a well in water depth of 8,009 feet (2,441 m) at the Great White field (Alaminos Canyon block 857).

In the same year, the new record was set at 8,070 feet (2,460 m) while drilling at the Alaminos Canyon block 813.

This record was surpassed in 2003 by water depth of 8,717 feet (2,657 m) at the Alaminos Canyon block 857.

In 2004, the water-depth of 8,951 feet (2,728 m) was achieved in Lloyd block 399.

In March 2009, Deepwater Nautilus discovered oil at the Appomattox prospect in Mississippi Canyon blocks 391 and 392.

=== Incidents ===
In 2004, at the time of Hurricane Ivan Deepwater Nautilus broke free from its location.

In 2005, as a result of Hurricane Katrina Deepwater Nautilus had drifted off location. All personnel had been safely evacuated before the approach of the storm.

The rig's mooring system revealed significant damage and the rig lost approximately 3,200 feet (980 m) of marine riser and a portion of the subsea well control system.

Less than a month later, Deepwater Nautilus broke free during Hurricane Rita.
