= Keathley Canyon =

Undersea canyon in Gulf of Mexico

Keathley Canyon (the United States)

Bathymetric features of the northwestern Gulf of Mexico

Keathley Canyon is an undersea canyon in the United States Exclusive Economic Zone in the Gulf of Mexico. It is named for the hydrographic survey ship USNS Sergeant George D. Keathley (T-AGS-35).

The Canyon is rich in oil fields. The major oilfields at the Keathley Canyon are Tiber, Kaskida, Lucius, and Buckskin. Many oil companies, including Chevron Corporation, BP, Anadarko Petroleum, ExxonMobil, Repsol, Shell, Devon Energy, BHP, Eni, Navitas Petroleum and Total have leased the rights to drill for oil in this area.

In June 2011, ExxonMobil announced two major oil and gas discoveries in Keathley Canyon blocks 918, 919, and 964 (Hadrian field) 250 miles (400 km) southwest of New Orleans, with combined estimated reserves of 700 million barrels (110×10^{6} m^{3}). The find was "the company's first deepwater exploration well following a U.S. moratorium" after the Deepwater Horizon explosion and oil spill in the Gulf in 2010 and "one of the largest discoveries in the Gulf ... in the last decade". "Exxon holds a 50% working interest in four ... blocks. Units owned by Petrobras and Eni hold a 25% interest in three of the blocks. Petrobras also owns 50% of one of the blocks."
