= Sedimentary basin analysis =

Sedimentary basin analysis is a geologic method by which the formation and evolution history of a sedimentary basin is revealed, by analyzing the sediment fill and subsidence. Subsidence of sedimentary basins generates the spatial distribution of accommodation infilling sediments. Aspects of the sediment, namely its composition, primary structures, and internal architecture, can be synthesized into a history of the basin fill. Such a synthesis can reveal how the basin formed, how the sediment fill was transported or precipitated, and reveal sources of the sediment fill. From such syntheses, models can be developed to explain broad basin formation mechanisms. Examples of such basin classifications include intracratonic, rift, passive margin, strike-slip, forearc, backarc-marginal sea, fold and thrust belt, and foreland basins.

Sedimentary basin analysis is largely conducted by two types of geologists who have slightly different goals and approaches. The petroleum geologist, whose ultimate goal is to determine the possible presence and extent of hydrocarbons and hydrocarbon-bearing rocks in a basin, and the academic geologist, who may be concerned with any or all facets of a basin's evolution. Petroleum industry basin analysis is often conducted on subterranean basins through the use of reflection seismology and data from well logging. Academic geologists study subterranean basins as well as those basins which have been exhumed and dissected by subsequent tectonic events. Thus, academics sometimes use petroleum industry techniques, but in many cases, they are able to study rocks at the surface. Techniques used to study surficial sedimentary rocks include: measuring stratigraphic sections, identifying sedimentary depositional environments and constructing a geological map.

An important tool in sedimentary basin analysis is sequence stratigraphy, in which various sedimentary sequences are related to pervasive changes in sea level and sediment supply.

== See also ==
- Basin modelling
- Tectonic stratigraphy
