= Manure-derived synthetic crude oil =

Synthetic bio-oil converted from manure

Manure-derived synthetic crude oil is a synthetic bio-oil chemically engineered (converted) from animal or human manure. Research into the production of manure-derived synthetic fuel began with pig manure in 1996 at the University of Illinois at Urbana–Champaign by the research team led by professors Yuanhui Zhang and Lance Schideman. They developed a method for converting raw pig manure into bio-oil through thermal depolymerization (thermochemical conversion). This process uses a thermochemical conversion reactor to apply heat and pressure for breaking down carbohydrate materials. As a result, bio-oil, methane and carbon dioxide are produced.

With further research, large-scale chemical processing in a refinery-style environment could help process millions of gallons of "pig biocrude" per day. However, this technology is still in its infancy and could produce only 18 US fluid ounces (530 ml) of oil per 1 US gallon (3.8 L; 0.83 imp gal) of manure. In 2006, preparations for a construction of a pilot plant started. It is developed by Snapshot Energy, a start-up firm.

According to the tests conducted by the National Institute of Standards and Technology pig manure biocrude produced by current technology contains 15% water, sulfur and char waste containing heavy metals, which should be removed to improve the quality of oil.

== See also ==
- Alternative fuels
- Energy and the environment
- Poultry litter
