= Kaskida Oil Field =

American oil field in the Gulf of Mexico

- Country: United States
- Region: Gulf of Mexico
- Location: Keathley Canyon
- Block: 291, 292
- Offshore/onshore: Offshore
- Operator: BP (100%)
- Partners: None

Field history
- Discovery: 2006

Production
- Estimated oil in place: 3,000 million barrels (~4.1×10^{8} t)
- Producing formations: Lower Tertiary

The Kaskida Oil Field is an offshore oil field located in the Keathley Canyon block 292 of the United States sector of the Gulf of Mexico, 250 miles (400 km) south-west of New Orleans, Louisiana. The field is operated by BP, and owned by BP (100%).

== History ==
The petroleum rights for the block 292 were acquired by BP, Devon Energy and Anadarko Petroleum in a federal lease sale in August 2003. The Kaskida field was discovered in 2006 in a water depth of 5,860 feet (1,790 m). Transocean's drilling rig Deepwater Horizon drilled a well to a total depth of approximately 32,500 feet (9,900 m). Drilling in the block 291, located 5 miles (8.0 km) to the west from the block 292, started in 2008 and oil was found in November 2009.

Originally BP owned 55%, Anadarko 25%, and Devon 20% of the project. In March 2008, Anadarko agreed to sell its stake to Statoil but BP and Devon exercised their pre-emption rights. BP drilled appraisal wells with the W. Sirius.

== Reserves ==
The Kaskida field is expected to contain 3 billion barrels (480×10^{6} m^{3}) of oil in place. It is one of the largest Paleogene discoveries.

== Development ==
The well in block 291 is drilled by the West Sirius rig, owned Seadrill Offshore. BP plans to start well tests in 2011.
