= Futures exchange =

Financial exchange for futures contracts

A futures exchange or futures market is a central financial exchange where people can trade standardized futures contracts defined by the exchange. Futures contracts are derivatives contracts to buy or sell specific quantities of a commodity or financial instrument at a specified price with delivery set at a specified time in the future. Futures exchanges provide physical or electronic trading venues, details of standardized contracts, market and price data, clearing houses, exchange self-regulations, margin mechanisms, settlement procedures, delivery times, delivery procedures and other services to foster trading in futures contracts. Futures exchanges can be integrated under the same brand name or organization with other types of exchanges, such as stock markets, options markets, and bond markets. Futures exchanges can be organized as non-profit member-owned organizations or as for-profit organizations. Non-profit, member-owned futures exchanges benefit their members, who earn commissions and revenue acting as brokers or market makers; they are privately owned. For-profit futures exchanges earn most of their revenue from trading and clearing fees, and are often public corporations.

== Role in futures contracts standardization ==
Futures exchanges establish standardized contracts for trading on their trading venues, and they usually specify the following: assets to be delivered in the contract, delivery arrangements, delivery months, pricing formula for daily and final settlement, contract size, and price position and limits. For assets to be delivered, futures exchanges usually specify one or more grades of a commodity acceptable for delivery and for any price adjustments applied to delivery. For example, the standard deliverable grade for CME Group's corn futures contract is "No. 2 Yellow", but holders of short positions in the contract can deliver "No. 3 Yellow" corn for 1.5 cents less than the contract delivery price per bushel. The locations where assets are delivered are also specified by the futures exchanges, and they may also specify alternative delivery locations and any price adjustments available when delivering to alternative locations. Delivery locations accommodate the particular delivery, storage, and marketing needs of the deliverable asset. For example, ICE frozen concentrate orange juice contracts specify delivery locations as exchange-licensed warehouses in Florida, New Jersey, or Delaware, while in the case of CME live cattle contracts, delivery is to exchange-approved livestock yards and slaughter plants in the Midwest. The futures exchange also determines the amount of deliverable assets for each contract, which determines a contract's size. Contract sizes that are too large will dissuade trading and hedging of small positions, while contract sizes that are too small will increase transaction costs since there are costs associated with each contract. In some cases, futures exchanges have created "mini" contracts to attract smaller traders. For example, the CME Group's Mini Nasdaq 100 contract is on 20 times the Nasdaq 100 index.

== Clearing and margin mechanisms ==
Futures exchanges provide access to clearing houses that stand in the middle of every trade. Suppose trader A purchases US$145,000 of gold futures contracts from trader B. The reality is that Trader A has bought a futures contract to buy US$145,000 of gold from the clearing house at a future time, and trader B has a contract to sell US$145,000 to the clearing house at that same time. Since the clearing house has taken on the obligation of both sides of that trade, trader A does not have to worry about trader B becoming unable or unwilling to settle the contract – they do not have to worry about trader B's credit risk. Trader A only has to worry about the ability of the clearing house to fulfill their contracts.

Even though clearing houses are exposed to every trade on the exchange, they have more tools to manage credit risk. Clearing houses can issue margin calls to require traders to deposit Initial Margin moneys when they open a position, and to deposit Variation Margin (or Mark-to-Market Margin) moneys when existing positions experience daily losses. A margin in general is collateral that the holder of a financial instrument has to deposit to cover some or all of the credit risk of their counterparty, in this case the central counterparty clearing houses. Traders on both sides of a trade have to deposit Initial Margin, and this amount is kept by the clearing house and not remitted to other traders. Clearing houses calculate day-to-day profit and loss amounts by 'marking-to-market' all positions by setting their new cost to the previous day's settlement value, and computing the difference between their current day settlement value and new cost. When traders accumulate losses on their position such that the balance of their existing posted margin and their new debits from losses is below a threshold called a maintenance margin (usually a fraction of the initial margin) at the end of a day, they have to send Variation Margin to the exchange, which passes that money to traders making profits on the opposite side of that position. When traders accumulate profits on their positions such that their margin balance is above the maintenance margin, they are entitled to withdraw the excess balance.

The margin system ensures that on any given day, if all parties in a trade closed their positions after variation margin payments after settlement, nobody would need to make any further payments, as the losing side of the position would have already sent the whole amount they owe to the profiting side of the position. The clearing house does not retain any variation margin. When traders cannot pay the variation margin they owe or are otherwise in default, the clearing house closes their positions and tries to cover their remaining obligations to other traders using their posted initial margin and any reserves available to the clearing house. Several popular methods are used to compute initial margins. They include the CME-owned SPAN (a grid simulation method used by the CME and about 70 other exchanges), STANS (a Monte Carlo simulation based methodology used by the Options Clearing Corporation (OCC)), and TIMS (earlier used by the OCC, and still being used by a few other exchanges).

Traders do not interact directly with the exchange – they interact with clearing house members, usually futures brokers, who pass contracts and margin payments on to the exchange. Clearing house members are directly responsible for initial margin and variation margin requirements at the exchange even if their clients default on their obligations, so they may require more initial margin (but not variation margin) from their clients than is required by the exchange to protect themselves. Since clearing house members usually have many clients, they can net out margin payments from their client's offsetting positions. For example, if a clearing house member has some of their clients holding a total of 900 long position in a contract, and some other clients holding a total of 500 short position in a contract, the clearing house member is only responsible for the initial and variation margin of a net 400 contracts.

== Nature of contracts ==
Exchange-traded contracts are standardized by the exchanges where they trade. The contract details what asset is to be bought or sold, and how, when, where and in what quantity it is to be delivered. The terms also specify the currency in which the contract will trade, minimum tick value, and the last trading day and expiry or delivery month. Standardized commodity futures contracts may also contain provisions for adjusting the contracted price based on deviations from the "standard" commodity, for example, a contract might specify delivery of heavier USDA Number 1 oats at par value but permit delivery of Number 2 oats for a certain seller's penalty per bushel.

Before the market opens on the first day of trading a new futures contract, there is a specification, but no actual contracts exist. Futures contracts are not issued like other securities, but are "created" whenever open interest increases; that is, when one party first buys (goes long) a contract from another party (who goes short). Contracts are also "destroyed" in the opposite manner whenever open interest decreases because traders resell to reduce their long positions or rebuy to reduce their short positions.

Speculators on futures price fluctuations who do not intend to make or take ultimate delivery must take care to "zero their positions" prior to the contract's expiry. After expiry, each contract will be settled, either by physical delivery (typically for commodity underlyings) or by a cash settlement (typically for financial underlyings). The contracts ultimately are not between the original buyer and the original seller, but between the holders at expiry and the exchange. Because a contract may pass through many hands after it is created by its initial purchase and sale, or even be liquidated, settling parties do not know with whom they have ultimately traded.

== Regulators ==
Each exchange is normally regulated by a national governmental (or semi-governmental) regulatory agency:

| Country or territory | Agency |
|---|---|
| Australia | Australian Securities and Investments Commission |
| Chinese mainland | China Securities Regulatory Commission |
| Hong Kong | Securities and Futures Commission |
| India | Securities and Exchange Board of India |
| South Korea | Financial Supervisory Service |
| Japan | Financial Services Agency |
| Pakistan | Securities and Exchange Commission of Pakistan |
| Singapore | Monetary Authority of Singapore |
| UK | Financial Conduct Authority |
| US | Commodity Futures Trading Commission |
| Malaysia | Securities Commission Malaysia |
| Spain | Comisión Nacional del Mercado de Valores (CNMV) |
| Brazil | Comissão de Valores Mobiliários (CVM) |
| South Africa | Financial Sector Conduct Authority (South Africa) |
| Mauritius | Financial Services Commission (FSC) |
| Indonesia | Commodity Futures Trading Regulatory Agency (BAPPEPTI) |

== History ==
=== Ancient times ===
In Ancient Mesopotamia, around 1750 BC, the sixth Babylonian king, Hammurabi, created one of the first legal codes: the Code of Hammurabi.

Hammurabi's Code allowed sales of goods and assets to be delivered for an agreed price at a future date; required contracts to be in writing and witnessed; and allowed assignment of contracts. The code facilitated the first derivatives, in the form of forward and futures contracts. An active derivatives market existed, with trading carried out at temples.

One of the earliest written records of futures trading is in Aristotle's Politics. He tells the story of Thales, a poor philosopher from Miletus who developed a "financial device, which involves a principle of universal application". Thales used his skill in forecasting and predicted that the olive harvest would be exceptionally good the next autumn. Confident in his prediction, he made agreements with local olive-press owners to deposit his money with them to guarantee him exclusive use of their olive presses when the harvest was ready. Thales successfully negotiated low prices because the harvest was in the future and no one knew whether the harvest would be plentiful or pathetic and because the olive-press owners were willing to hedge against the possibility of a poor yield. When the harvest-time came, and a sharp increase in demand for the use of the olive presses outstripped supply (availability of the presses), he sold his future use contracts of the olive presses at a rate of his choosing, and made a large amount of money. This is a very loose example of futures trading and, in fact, more closely resembles an option contract, given that Thales was not obliged to use the olive presses if the yield was poor.

=== Modern era ===
The first modern organized futures exchange began in 1730 at the Dojima Rice Exchange in Osaka, Japan.

The London Metal Market and Exchange Company (London Metal Exchange) was founded in 1877, but the market traces its origins back to 1571 and the opening of the Royal Exchange, London. Before the exchange was created, business was conducted by traders in London coffee houses using a makeshift ring drawn in chalk on the floor. At first only copper was traded. Lead and zinc were soon added but only gained official trading status in 1920. The exchange was closed during World War II and did not re-open until 1952. The range of metals traded was extended to include aluminium (1978), nickel (1979), tin (1989), aluminium alloy (1992), steel (2008), and minor metals cobalt and molybdenum (2010). The exchange ceased trading plastics in 2011. The total value of the trade is around $11.6 trillion annually.

Chicago has the largest future exchange in the world, the CME Group. The CME Group's oldest exchange was founded in 1848. Chicago is located at the base of the Great Lakes, close to the farmlands and cattle country of the Midwest, making it a natural center for transportation, distribution, and trading of agricultural produce. Gluts and shortages of these products caused chaotic fluctuations in price, and this led to the development of a market enabling grain merchants, processors, and agriculture companies to trade in "to arrive" or "cash forward" contracts to insulate them from the risk of adverse price change and enable them to hedge. In March 2008 the CME announced its acquisition of NYMEX Holdings, Inc., the parent company of the New York Mercantile Exchange and Commodity Exchange. CME's acquisition of NYMEX was completed in August 2008.

For most exchanges, forward contracts were standard at the time. However, forward contracts were often not honored by either the buyer or the seller. For instance, if the buyer of a corn forward contract made an agreement to buy corn, and at the time of delivery the price of corn differed dramatically from the original contract price, either the buyer or the seller would back out. Additionally, the forward contracts market was very illiquid, and an exchange was needed that would bring together a market to find potential buyers and sellers of a commodity instead of making people bear the burden of finding a buyer or seller.

In 1848 the Chicago Board of Trade (CBOT) was formed. Trading was originally in forward contracts; the first contract (on corn) was written on March 13, 1851. In 1865 standardized futures contracts were introduced.

The Chicago Produce Exchange was established in 1874, renamed the Chicago Butter and Egg Board in 1898 and then reorganized into the Chicago Mercantile Exchange (CME) in 1919. Following the end of the postwar international gold standard, in 1972 the CME formed a division called the International Monetary Market (IMM) to offer futures contracts in foreign currencies: British pound, Canadian dollar, German mark, Japanese yen, Mexican peso, and Swiss franc.

In 1881 a regional market was founded in Minneapolis, Minnesota, and in 1883 introduced futures for the first time. Trading continuously since then, today the Minneapolis Grain Exchange (MGEX) is the only exchange for hard red spring wheat futures and options.

Futures trading used to be very active in India in the early to late 19th Century in the Marwari business community. Several families made their fortunes in opium futures trading in Calcutta and Bombay. There are records available of standardized opium futures contracts made in the 1870-1880s in Calcutta. There are strong grounds to believe that commodity futures could have existed in India for thousands of years before then, with references to the existence of market operations similar to the modern day futures market in Kautilya's Arthashastra written in the 2nd century BCE. The first organised futures market was established in 1875 by the Bombay Cotton Trade Association to trade in cotton contracts. This occurred soon after the establishment of trading in cotton Futures in UK, as Bombay was a very important hub for cotton trade in the British Empire. Futures trading in raw jute and jute goods began in Calcutta with the establishment of the Calcutta Hessian Exchange Ltd., in 1919. In modern times, most of the futures trading happens in the National Multi commodity Exchange (NMCE) which commenced futures trading in 24 commodities on 26 November 2002 on a national scale. Currently (August 2007) 62 commodities are being traded on the NMCE.

=== Recent developments ===
The 1970s saw the development of the financial futures contracts, which allowed trading in the future value of interest rates. These (in particular the 90‑day Eurodollar contract introduced in 1981) had an enormous impact on the development of the interest rate swap market.

The London International Financial Futures Exchange (LIFFE) was launched in 1982, to take advantage of the removal of currency controls in the UK in 1979. The exchange modelled itself after the Chicago Board of Trade and the Chicago Mercantile Exchange. LIFFE was acquired by Euronext in 2002, which in turn was acquired by NYSE in 2006. The combined NYSE Euronext, including LIFFE, was purchased by ICE in 2014.

Today, the futures markets have far outgrown their agricultural origins. With the addition of the New York Mercantile Exchange (NYMEX) the trading and hedging of financial products using futures dwarfs the traditional commodity markets, and plays a major role in the global financial system, trading over $1.5 trillion per day in 2005.

The recent history of these exchanges (Aug 2006) finds the Chicago Mercantile Exchange trading more than 70% of its futures contracts on its "Globex" trading platform and this trend is rising daily. It counts for over $45.5 billion of nominal trade (over 1 million contracts) every single day in "electronic trading" as opposed to open outcry trading of futures, options and derivatives.

In June 2001 Intercontinental Exchange (ICE) acquired the International Petroleum Exchange (IPE), now ICE Futures, which operated Europe's leading open-outcry energy futures exchange. Since 2003 ICE has partnered with the Chicago Climate Exchange (CCX) to host its electronic marketplace. In April 2005 the entire ICE portfolio of energy futures became fully electronic.

In 2005, The Africa Mercantile Exchange (AfMX®) became the first African commodities market to implement an automated system for the dissemination of market data and information online in real-time through a wide network of computer terminals. As at the end of 2007, AfMX® had developed a system of secure data storage providing online services for brokerage firms. The year 2010, saw the exchange unveil a novel system of electronic trading, known as After®. After® extends the potential volume of processing of information and allows the Exchange to increase its overall volume of trading activities.

In 2006 the New York Stock Exchange teamed up with the Amsterdam-Brussels-Lisbon-Paris Exchanges "Euronext" electronic exchange to form the first transcontinental futures and options exchange. These two developments as well as the sharp growth of internet futures trading platforms developed by a number of trading companies clearly points to a race to total internet trading of futures and options in the coming years.

In terms of trading volume, the National Stock Exchange of India in Mumbai is the largest single-stock futures trading exchange in the world.

== See also ==
- Bond market
- Commodity markets
- Currency market
- List of futures exchanges
- List of traded commodities
- Paper trading
- Prediction market
- Stock market
- Trader (finance)
