= DME Oman Crude Oil Futures Contract =

Asian crude oil pricing benchmark

Launched by the Dubai Mercantile Exchange (DME) on 1 June 2007, the DME Oman Crude Oil Futures Contract (OQD) is the Asian crude oil pricing benchmark. The contract is traded on the CME Group’s electronic platform CME Globex, and cleared through CME Clearport.

== Role in Crude Oil Pricing and Risk Management ==
The DME Oman Crude Oil Futures Contract plays an important role in the international oil market by providing a transparent, exchange-traded price reference for crude oil exported from the Middle East to Asian markets. The move provided an oil futures contract for pricing Middle East sour crude compared to WTI and Brent benchmarks which are sweet/light crude oil, and are less suitable for pricing sour/heavy crude oils which represent a large percentage of the Middle East’s total crude oil exports. Introduced in 2007, the contract enables oil producers, refiners and traders to assess market prices and manage exposure to fluctuations in crude oil prices through futures trading. Its physical-delivery mechanism links the futures price to the underlying crude oil market, supporting price discovery and hedging for market participants. Oman adopted the contract's settlement price as the basis for pricing its crude oil exports in 2007, followed by Dubai in 2009, Saudi Aramco and Bahrain Petroleum Company in 2018, and Kuwait Petroleum Corporation in 2020. According to the exchange's operator, the contract has become an established reference for Middle Eastern crude exports to markets east of the Suez Canal.

The contract is also relevant to the United Arab Emirates (UAE), particularly Dubai, which incorporated the DME Oman settlement price into its crude oil pricing arrangements in 2009. By using the settlement price to determine the official selling price of its crude oil, Dubai adopted an exchange-based reference that reflects market trading and provides buyers and sellers with a common basis for pricing transactions. This arrangement illustrates the practical importance of the contract beyond Oman: producers can use its settlement price to establish export prices, while traders and refiners can use the futures market to manage exposure to price changes. The UAE's wider involvement in oil futures trading is also reflected in Abu Dhabi's launch of the Murban crude oil futures contract in 2021.

Between 2015 and 2020, the DME Oman Crude Oil Futures Contract developed into an increasingly important pricing reference for Middle Eastern crude exports to Asia. A significant development came in 2018, when Saudi Aramco incorporated DME Oman into its official selling price formula for Asian customers, alongside Platts Dubai. In January 2020, Kuwait Petroleum Corporation announced that it would also adopt DME Oman as part of its pricing formula for crude exports to Asia, effective February 2020.These developments expanded the benchmark's use among major regional oil producers. Market analysis during this period also highlighted limitations in trading liquidity beyond the front-month contract, particularly for longer-term hedging and risk management.

Between 2020 and 2025, the DME Oman benchmark continued to support regional crude-oil pricing and trading. In 2023, physical deliveries through the exchange reached a record 21.8 million barrels per delivery month, while spot-month trading exceeded 800,000 contracts. In 2024, trading activity increased further, with total Oman futures trading reaching approximately 1.32 million contracts, representing a 12% increase compared with 2023.

== Contract specifications ==
Trading unit	1,000 barrels (160 m^{3}).
Price quotation	U.S. dollars and cents per barrel.
Trading symbol	OQD
Trading hours	Electronic trading is open from 18:00 U.S. Eastern Standard Time (EST) and closes at 17:15 EST the next day, Sunday to Friday. Singapore is 13 hours ahead of EST and Dubai is 9 hours ahead. The time difference is reduced by one hour when Daylight Saving Time is in effect. Neither Dubai nor Singapore observes Daylight Saving Time.
Trading months	The current year and the next five years are listed. A new calendar year is added following the termination of trading in the December contract of the current year.
Minimum price fluctuation	$0.01 (1) per barrel ($10.00 per contract).
Maximum daily price fluctuation	None.
Daily settlement	A daily OSP settlement price is published as at 16:30 (Singapore) 03:30 or 04:30 EST. This price represents the weighted average price of trades in the nearby Contract Month between 16:25 and 16:30 (Singapore). The DME also publishes an end of trading day settlement price for all listed Contract Months, determined as at 14:30 EST, which coincides with the end of the trading day for NYMEX Light Sweet Crude Oil. This latter settlement price is used by the Clearing House to calculate daily variation margin on all open DME Contracts.
Final settlement price	The Final Settlement Price for a Contract Month is the OSP settlement price on the last Trading Day of the Contract Month. This price represents the weighted average price of trades in the nearby Contract Month between 16:15 and 16:30 (Singapore). The Final Settlement Price is used for purposes of margins for delivery of the Oil.
Last Trading Day	Trading in the nearby Contract Month ceases on the last Trading Day of the second month preceding the Delivery Month.
Settlement Type	Physical.
Delivery	F.O.B at the Loading Port, consistent with current terminal operations. Complete delivery rules and provisions are detailed in Chapter 10 of the rulebook.
Governing law	English Law.

== Statistics ==
	2007*	2008	2009	2010
Average daily volume	1,357,000 bbl (215,700 m^{3})	1,274,000 bbl (202,500 m^{3})	2,156,000 bbl (342,800 m^{3})	2,944,000 bbl (468,100 m^{3})
Total trade volume	200,892,000 bbl (31,939,300 m^{3})	322,294,000 bbl (51,240,700 m^{3})	551,866,000 bbl (87,739,700 m^{3})	744,727,000 bbl (118,402,100 m^{3})
Total physical deliveries	17,203,000 bbl (2,735,100 m^{3})	95,369,000 bbl (15,162,500 m^{3})	104,380,000 bbl (16,595,000 m^{3})	144,892,000 bbl (23,036,000 m^{3})

*: the exchanged opened on 1 June 2007.

== DME Oman linked contracts ==
On 5 December 2010, NYMEX launched six DME Oman-linked contracts, traded bilaterally and cleared through CME Clearport. These new DME Oman-linked contracts complement the OQD Futures contract and give market participants regulated and transparent Over-The-Counter (OTC) contracts. The contracts are:

- DME Oman Crude Oil Swap Futures (DOO)
- DME Oman Crude Oil BALMO Swap Futures (DOB)
- ICE Brent vs. DME Oman Crude Oil Swap Futures (DBO)
- DME Oman Crude Oil Average Price Option (DOA)
- Singapore MOGAS 92 Unleaded (Platts) vs. DME Oman Crude Oil Swap Futures (DNB)
- Singapore Gasoil (Platts) vs. DME Oman Crude Oil Swap Future (DZB)

The two main contracts which traded immediately were the DOO and the DOB with over 1.7 million barrels (270,000 m^{3}) traded in the first week of their launch.

== See also ==
- West Texas Intermediate
- Dubai Mercantile Exchange
- CME Group
- Chicago Mercantile Exchange
- NYMEX
- Petroleum Development Oman
- Commodity Futures Trading Commission
- Dubai Financial Services Authority
- List of futures exchanges
- List of traded commodities
- Energy law
