= MotherRock =

MotherRock was an energy sector hedge fund, one of the biggest traders of natural gas derivatives in New York, with assets of around $430 million at one point. It closed in August 2006 due losing money on its bets that natural gas prices would fall. In 2006 the summer heat led to prices increasing and in June 2006 MotherRock Energy Fund lost 24.6 percent and then in July 25.5 percent. Leveraged positions exacerbated the situation and eventually led to a loss of around $230 million in June and July 2006.

== History ==
The fund was started by J. Robert Collins, with Conrad Goerl and ex-NYMEX vice president John D'Agostino in early 2005.

== Senate findings ==
When investigating sudden price movements in the natural gas markets, and specifically the role Amaranth Advisors played in these movements, it was ascertained that Amaranth's aggressive trading was the only reason for MotherRock's collapse.

It was found that Amaranth could distort market prices through large trades. On July 31, 2006, Amaranth's trading caused a 72% jump in the price spread that directly affected MotherRock's positions so badly that the latter could not meet its margin calls. MotherRock folded soon afterwards.
