= John D'Agostino (financial services) =

American businessperson

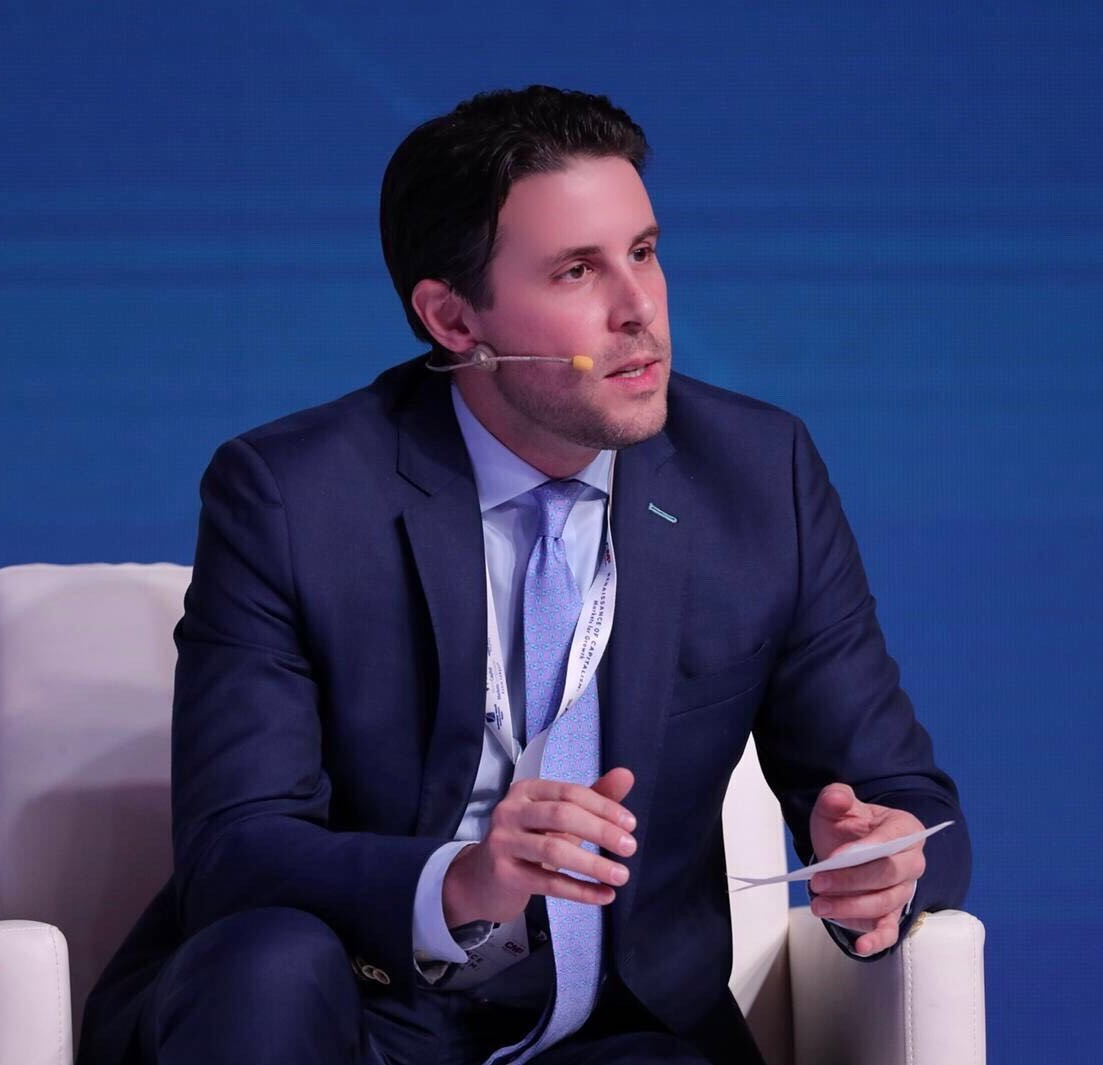
- D'Agostino in 2018
- Education: Williams College; Oxford University; Harvard Business School
- Occupations: Founder, Dagger Consulting LLC

John Joseph D'Agostino is an American business executive and entrepreneur. D'Agostino is a senior advisor to Coinbase and Chairman of US Asset Management Committee for the Department for International Trade. He previously was managing director at the world's largest fund governance firm DMS Offshore, where he was also on the board of hedge funds providing independent oversight. He was previously a managing director at Alkeon Capital Management, a multibillion-dollar registered investment adviser. Prior to this, D'Agostino was known primarily for his involvement in the early development of the Dubai Mercantile Exchange. In 2021, Mr. D'Agostino co-founded the Alternative Investment Management Association (AIMA) Digital Asset Working Group. He was named Fellow of the AIF Global Innovation Institute in 2022. D'Agostino has been on the board of Surf Air, an aviation and air charter company since 2018.

His story was the focus of the book Rigged, the True Story of an Ivy League Kid who Changed the World of Oil by New York Times best-selling author Ben Mezrich. Summit Entertainment acquired the screen rights to Rigged and the book has been optioned for film adaptation.

D'Agostino appeared in "The Startup of You" by Reid Hoffman in 2012. He is the founder of Dagger LLC, a strategic consulting and advisory services. He is a speaker at conferences and meetings on business topics such as negotiation, markets, and hedge funds.

== Early life ==
D'Agostino grew up in a working-class family in Staten Island, New York. He earned a scholarship to attend Regis High School and subsequently Williams College for his BA degree. He studied Politics, Philosophy and Economics at Oxford University, and obtained his MBA from Harvard Business School.

== Career ==
After graduating from Harvard Business School, D'Agostino joined the New York Mercantile Exchange where he helped transition the floor to electronic trading. He became the exchange's youngest Head of Strategy and led the effort to create the Dubai Mercantile Exchange in partnership with the Dubai Government. D'Agostino's efforts led to the development of the first Middle East commodity derivatives exchange, which laid the foundations for accelerating the development of capital markets in the region.

He subsequently served as Director of Corporate Development at Second Market and Director for hedge fund and private equity consulting at KPMG Advisory before joining Alkeon Capital Management.

D'Agostino has written case studies used by Harvard University and has been a guest lecturer for INSEAD University. He currently lectures at Massachusetts Institute of Technology and Columbia Business School. In 2012, he was a speaker at the Australian Davos Forum in Hayman Island, Australia. He has guest lectured for the United States Navy on the topic of "financial exchange expansion as an indicator of shifting political power" and advised the Hong Kong Exchanges and Clearing on its successful $1.3 billion acquisition of the London Metal Exchange. D'Agostino also serves as the Chair of the New York City UK Consulate's Asset Management Committee.

== Depictions in media ==
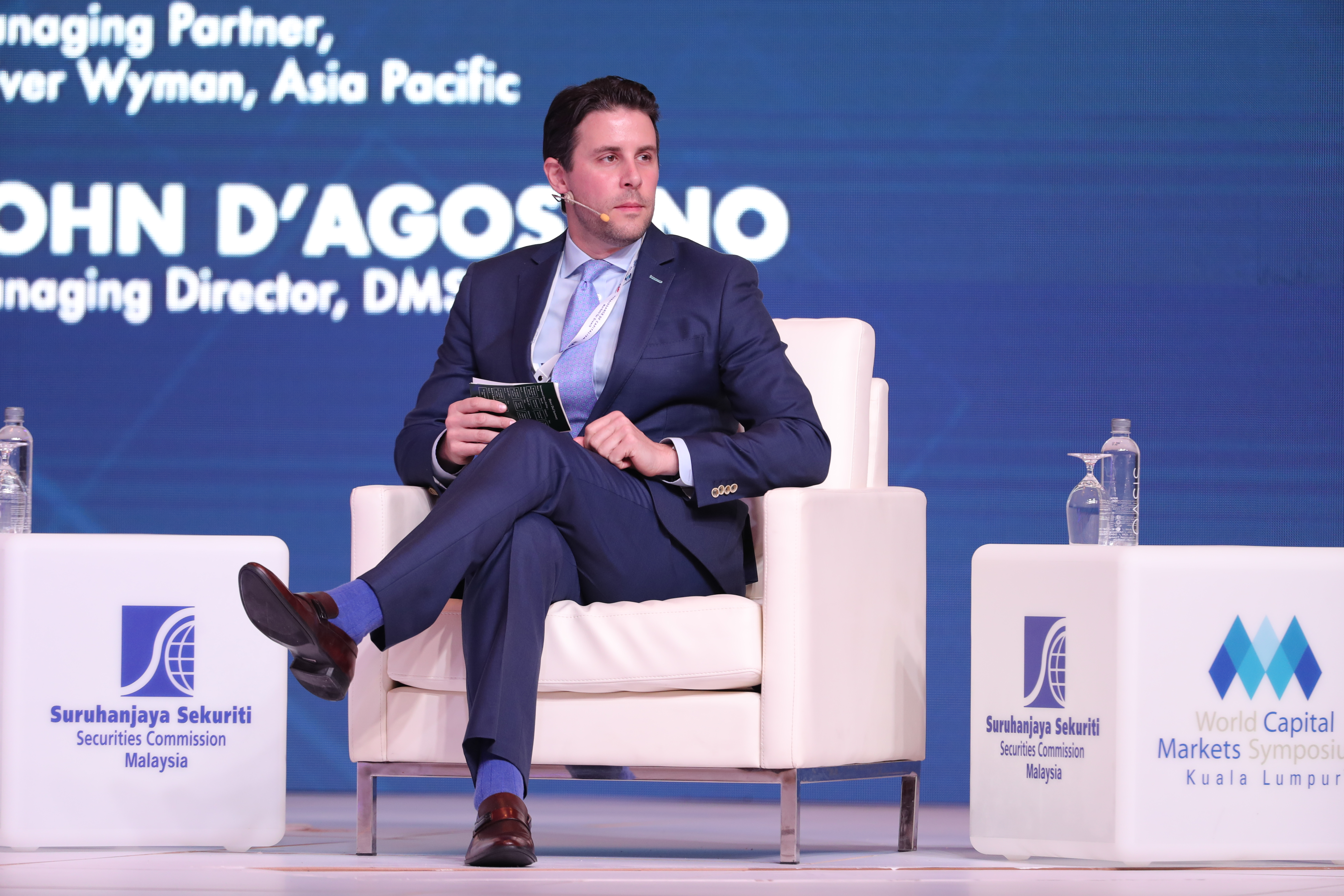
John D'Agostino speaking at the World Capital Markets Symposium 2018

=== Books ===
In 2007, his story became the focus of the book Rigged, the True Story of an Ivy League Kid who Changed the World of Oil by Ben Mezrich. The book was published in 2008 in United Kingdom with a slight variation in the title as Rigged, The True Story of a Wall Street Novice who Changed the World of Oil Forever.

According to the author's note, D'Agostino was initially reluctant for the book to be written and author Ben Mezrich convinced D'Agostino by using a pseudonym, changing the name of the primary character to David Russo. The book appeared on the New York Times Best Seller list for one week in 2007 and another in 2008. Summit Entertainment acquired the screen rights to Rigged.

D'Agostino was mentioned in a book by Wall Street journalist Leah McGrath Goodman, titled The Asylum: Inside the Rise and Ruin of the Global Oil Market published in 2011. The book, written as an exposé, traces the New York Mercantile Exchange's transformation from an obscure market specializing in commodity futures in the 1960s to its modern-day venue as the world's energy exchange.

In 2012, D'Agostino was featured in the book The Start-up of you by LinkedIn founder and Chairman Reid Hoffman. The book highlights lessons from Silicon Valley's most innovative entrepreneurs.

=== Media appearances ===
At the 2018 World Capital Markets Symposium, when asked to comment on the sustainability, diversity and equality in the finance industry, D'Agostino remarked "It doesn't matter if we are ready or not, the future is decidedly female" which received considerable media interest.

In June 2018, John D'Agostino and Nouriel Roubini led a discussion on cryptocurrencies at the Battle of the Quants in New York. In contrast to Roubini, D'Agostino remained neutral on cryptocurrencies and the blockchain ecosystem and its viability in the short-term, and cautiously optimistic in the long-term. D'Agostino estimated that 80 percent of ICOs were likely to fail, a figure quoted by Bloomberg.

In May 2019, D'Agostino was invited by the U.S. Securities and Exchange Commission to speak at their first FinTech forum on Digital Assets.

D'Agostino was a featured speaker at the Saudi LEAP Conference.

== Personal life ==
D'Agostino is married, has two daughters and resides in New York City.
