= Chicago Board of Trade =

Options and futures exchange in Chicago

Coordinates: 41.877821°N 87.632285°W

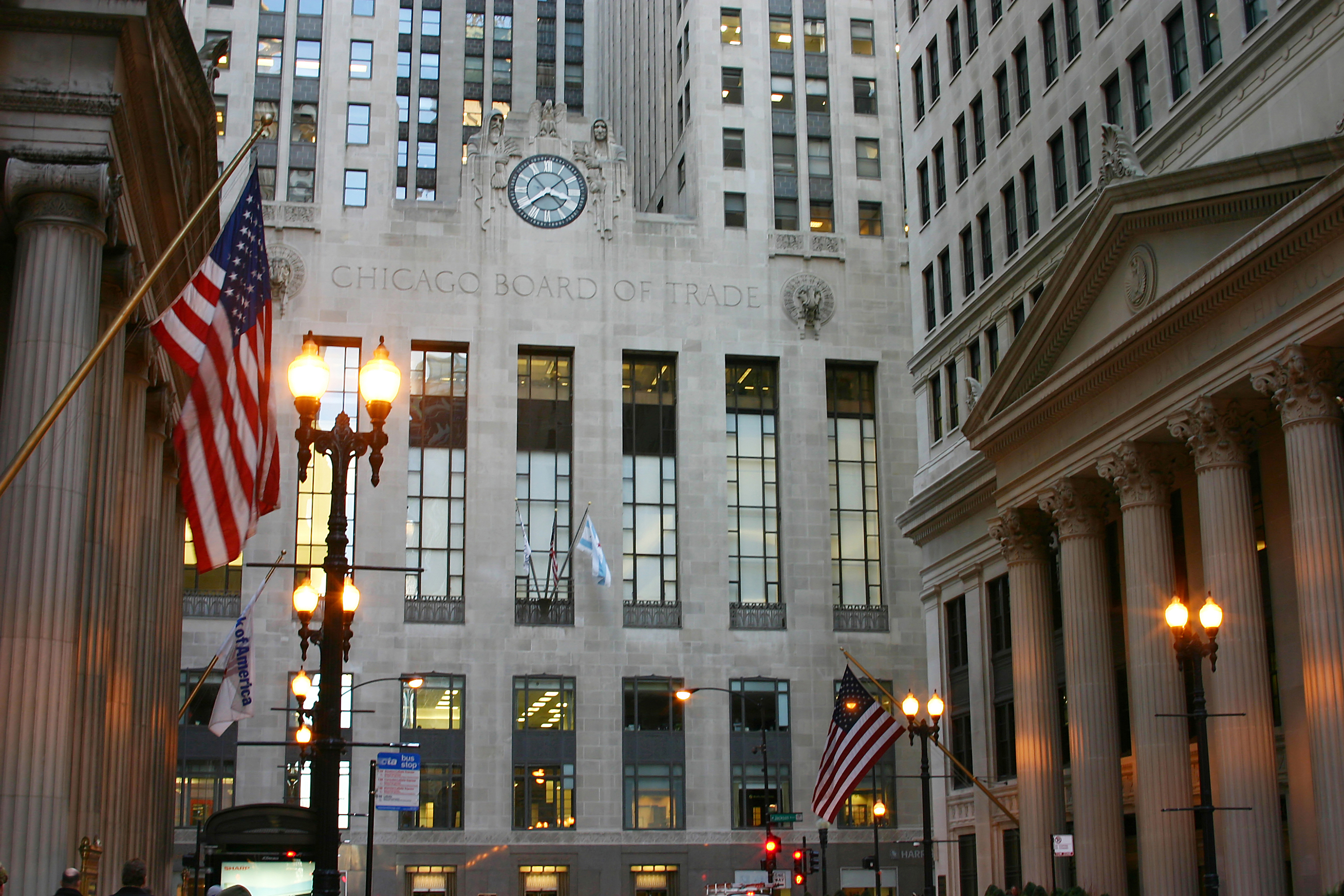
- Type: Subsidiary
- Location: Chicago, Illinois, United States
- Founded: 1848
- Owner: CME Group
- Website: cbot.com

The Chicago Board of Trade (CBOT) is an American futures and options exchange that was founded in 1848. It operated as an independent exchange for more than 150 years, before merging with its long-time rival the Chicago Mercantile Exchange (CME) to form CME Group in 2007. It is now a designated contract market of the CME Group.

Since 1930 it has operated out of the Chicago Board of Trade Building, a landmark Art Deco skyscraper in the Chicago Loop.

== History ==
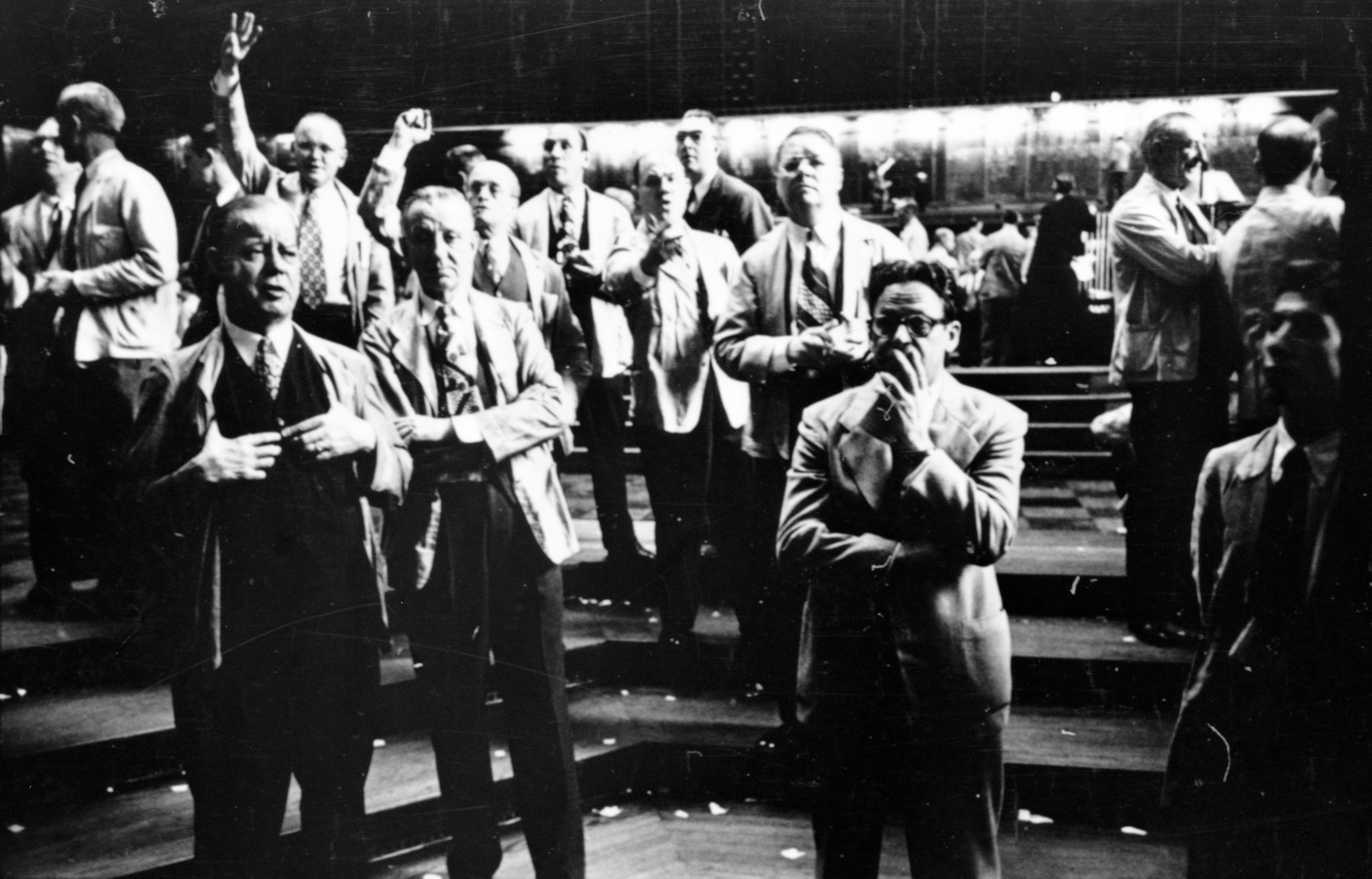
Men working the floor at the Chicago Board of Trade as photographed by Stanley Kubrick for Look magazine in 1949

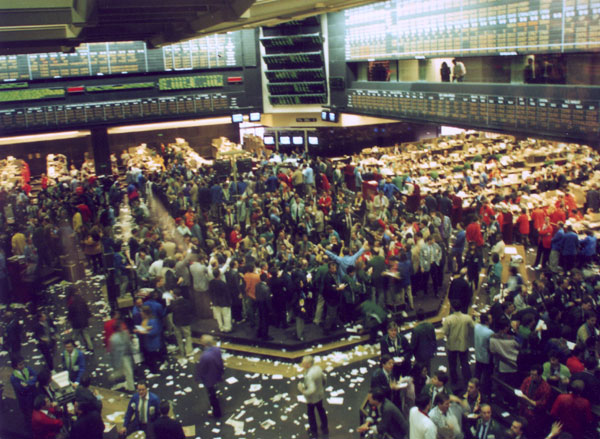
Trading floor at the Chicago Board of Trade in 1993

The Chicago Board of Trade (CBOT), established on April 3, 1848, is one of the world's oldest futures and options exchanges. It was created as a centralized venue where buyers and sellers could meet to negotiate and formalize forward contracts. The idea originated from a conversation between Thomas Richmond and W. L. Whiting, who discussed the potential benefits of forming a board of trade. Their exchange led to a March 13 meeting of merchants and businessmen who supported the initiative, resulting in a resolution to create the institution and draft a constitution. A committee was then formed to develop bylaws, which were officially adopted by 82 charter members on the first Monday of April. This development emerged from broader concerns among U.S. merchants about ensuring the availability of reliable markets for commodity exchange. To address these challenges, they had turned to forward contracts, though credit risk remained a persistent issue – one that the CBOT was specifically designed to help manage.

In 1864, the CBOT listed the first standardized "exchange traded" forward contracts, which were called futures contracts. In 1919, the Chicago Butter and Egg Board, a spin-off of the CBOT, was reorganized to enable member traders to allow future trading, and its name was changed to Chicago Mercantile Exchange (CME). The Board's restrictions on trading after hours on any prices other than those at the Board's close gave rise to a 1917 legal challenge, the Chicago Board of Trade v. United States. The U.S. Supreme Court held that language of the Sherman Antitrust Act of 1890 – which outlawed "every contract ... in restraint of trade" – should not be taken literally, but rather should be interpreted under a "rule of reason".

On October 19, 2005, the initial public offering of 3,191,489 CBOT shares was priced at $54.00 a share. On its first day of trading the stock closed up 49% at $80.50 on the New York Stock Exchange.

In 2007, the CBOT and the Chicago Mercantile Exchange merged to form the CME Group.

== Chicago Board of Trade Building ==
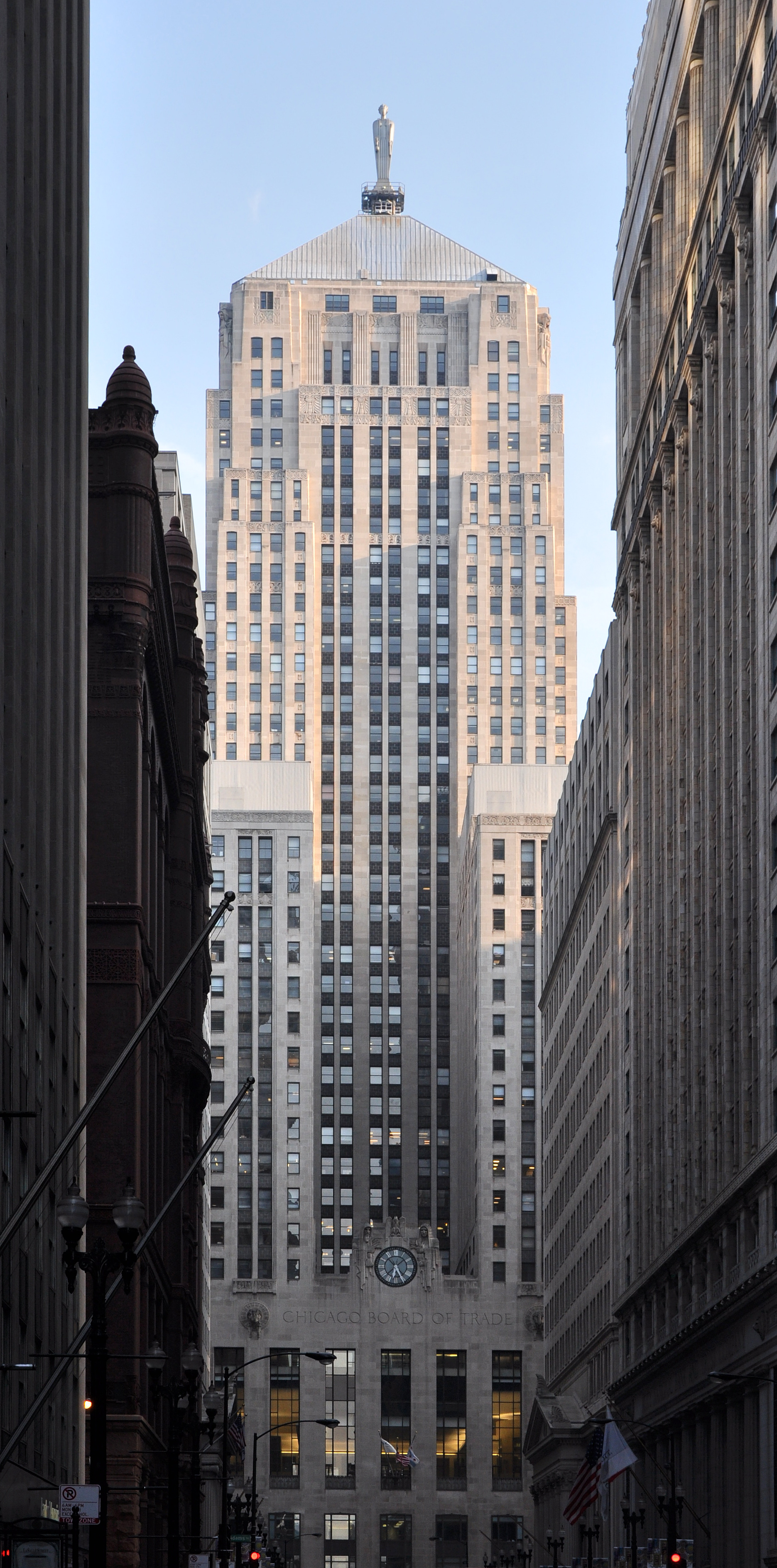
Chicago Board of Trade Building

Since 1930, the Chicago Board of Trade has been operating out of 141 West Jackson Boulevard, Chicago. The building was designed by Holabird & Root and is 605 feet (184 m) tall, the tallest in Chicago until the Richard J. Daley Center superseded it in 1965. The Art Deco building incorporates sculptural work by Alvin Meyer and is capped by a 31-foot-high (9.5 m) statue of the Roman goddess Ceres in reference to the exchange's role in trading grain. It has been claimed that the statue was left faceless because its sculptor, John Storrs, thought that no one would ever be able to see the face on top of a forty-five-floor skyscraper. However, it may be that the smooth surface of the aluminium statue is an element of the streamlined look of Art Deco.

In 1977, the CBOT building was designated a Chicago Landmark and a National Historic Landmark the following year. It is now one of many such skyscrapers in the city's Loop commercial district.

== Trading platforms ==
=== The Pit ===
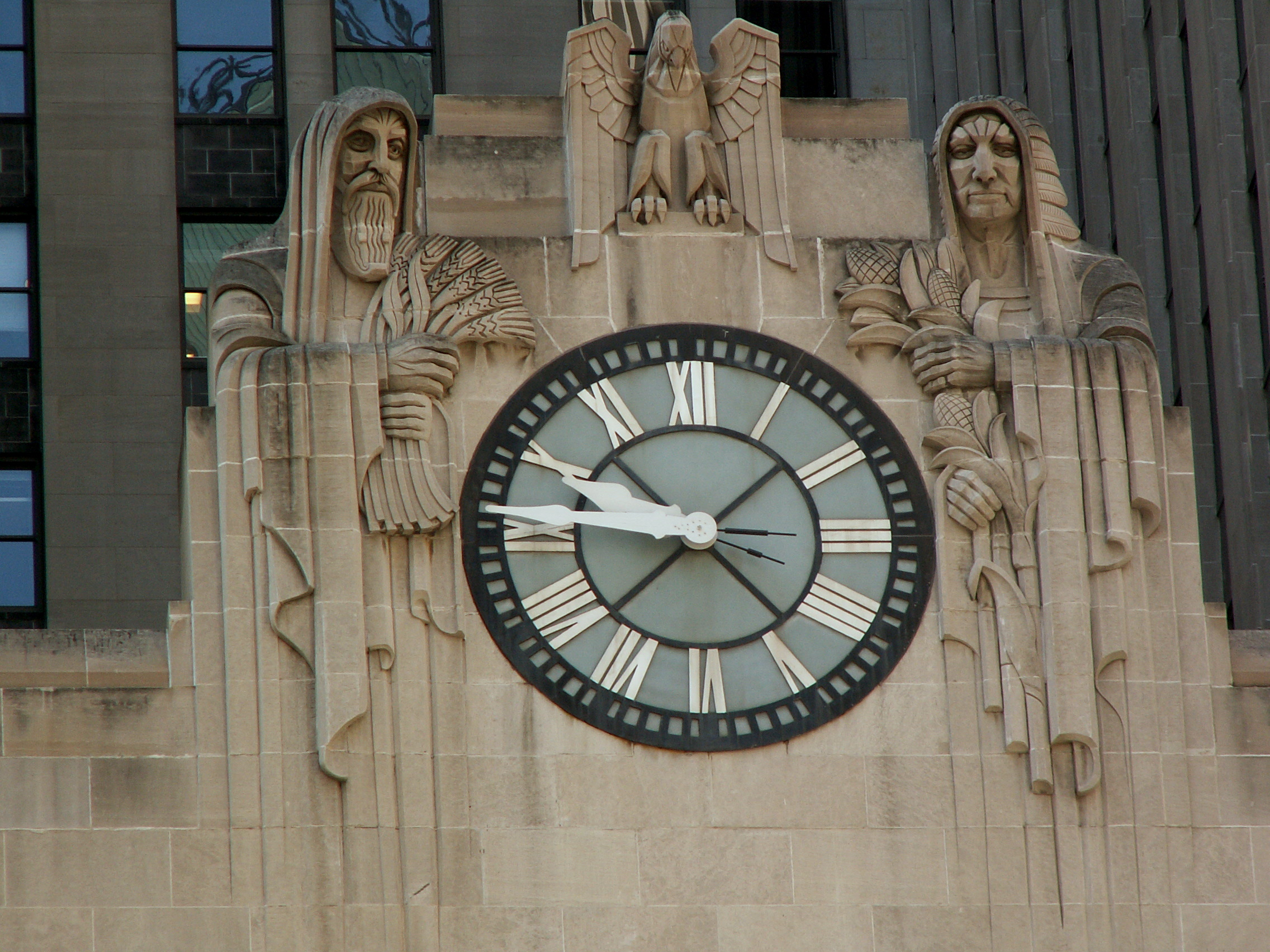
Clock on the front of the building

The pit is a raised octagonal structure where open-outcry trading takes place. Operating during regular trading hours (RTH), the CBOT trading floor contains many such pits.

The steps up on the outside of the octagon and the steps down on the inside give the pit something of the appearance of an amphitheater, and allow hundreds of traders to see and hear each other during trading hours. The importance of the pit and pit trading is emphasized by the use of a stylized pit as the logo of the CBOT. The Pit: a story of Chicago is also the title and subject of a 1903 novel by Frank Norris.

Trades are made in the pits by bidding or offering a price and quantity of contracts, depending on the intention to buy (bid) or sell (offer). This is generally done by using a physical representation of a trader's intentions with his hands. If a trader wants to buy ten contracts at a price of eight, for example, in the pit he would yell "8 for 10", stating price before quantity, and turn his palm toward his face, putting his index finger to his forehead denoting ten; if he were to be buying one, he would place his index finger on his chin. If the trader wants to sell five contracts at a price of eight, they would yell "5 at 8", stating quantity before price, and show one hand with palm facing outward, showing 5 fingers. The combination of hand-signals and vocal representation between the way a trader expresses bids and offers is a protection against misinterpretation by other market participants. For historical purposes, an illustrated project to record the hand signal language used in CBOT's trading pits has been compiled and published.

With the rise of electronic trading, the importance of the pit has decreased substantially for many contracts, though the pit remains the best place to get complex option spreads filled. In 2015, the Chicago Board of Trade officially eliminated the use of open outcry in all agricultural products in favor of electronic trading, a controversial move that angered some long-time traders.

== News lines ==
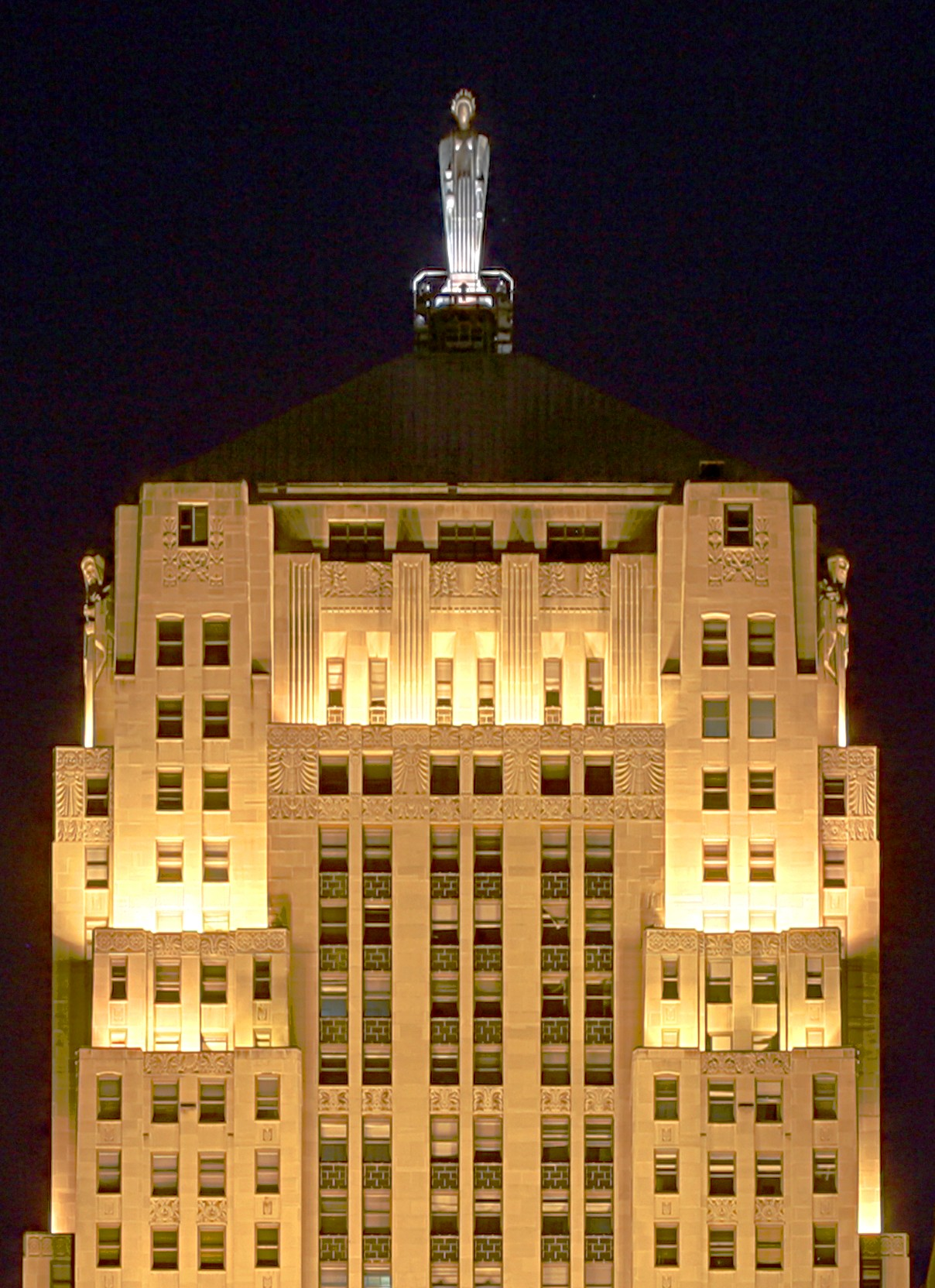
Board of Trade building

- On August 1, 1974, trading at the Chicago Board of Trade was halted after an anonymous caller said a bomb had been placed in the building.
- On October 22, 1981, trading was halted on the CBOT and the Philadelphia Stock Exchange after anonymous callers said bombs had been placed in those buildings.
- On August 1, 2006, the CBOT launched side-by-side trading for agricultural futures. Orders could be traded electronically or placed by pit traders using open outcry, creating a single pool of liquidity.
- On October 17, 2006, the Chicago Mercantile Exchange announced the purchase of the Chicago Board of Trade for $8 billion in stock, joining the two institutions as CME Group, Incorporated.
- On July 9, 2007, the announced merger with the Chicago Mercantile Exchange was approved by CBOT shareholders, "creating the largest derivatives market ever."

== See also ==
- Chicago Board of Trade Independent Battery Light Artillery
- Commodity Exchange Act
- Horatio G. Loomis
- List of futures exchanges
- List of traded commodities
- New York Mercantile Exchange
- Board of Trade of City of Chicago v. Olsen 262 U.S. 1 (1923)
- Chicago Board of Trade v. Christie Grain 198 U.S. 236 (1905)
