= Rigged (2007 book) =

2007 book by Ben Mezrich

Rigged: The True Story of an Ivy League Kid Who Changed the World of Oil, from Wall Street to Dubai
- Cover of the first edition
- Author: Ben Mezrich
- Language: English
- Subject: Commodities trading
- Genre: Non-fiction
- Publisher: HarperLuxe
- Publication date: October 23, 2007
- Publication place: United States
- Media type: Print, e-book
- Pages: 294 pp.
- ISBN: 9780061252723
- OCLC: 153579458
- Followed by: The Accidental Billionaires

Rigged: The True Story of a Wall Street Novice who Changed the World of Oil Forever is a book by author Ben Mezrich. The book recounts the story of John D'Agostino, whom the book renames David Russo. The hardback of the book was number 10 on the New York Times Best Seller list in 2007, and was number 29 in paperback nonfiction on December 14, 2008.

== Sources ==
Mezrich maintains that the book is non-fiction despite the narrative style of writing. Rigged is published as a biography and described by D'Agostino as "95 percent true, 5 percent minor embellishment".

== Synopsis ==
David Russo, fresh from Harvard Business School, secures a job in Wall Street as the dot-com bubble had just depressed the market. A chance meeting led to an opportunity at New York Mercantile Exchange—the world's largest energy exchange. At the Merc, he finds his working-class background helps him compete in the aggressive atmosphere. Russo quickly rises to become the Head of Strategy where he helps in the transition to electronic trading. In the aftermath of 9-11, Russo joined with colleagues to establish the Dubai Mercantile Exchange, a partnership between NYMEX and the government of Dubai. Through this venture, Russo helped accelerate the development of capital markets in the region.

== Film adaptation ==
Summit Entertainment acquired the screen rights to Rigged and the book has been optioned for movie production.
