= Live cattle =

Stock

Live cattle is a type of futures contract that can be used to hedge and speculate on fed cattle prices. Cattle producers, feedlot operators, and merchant exporters can hedge future selling prices for cattle through trading live cattle futures, and such trading is a common part of a producer's price risk management program. Conversely, meat packers, and merchant importers can hedge future buying prices for cattle. Producers and buyers of live cattle can also enter into production and marketing contracts for delivering live cattle in cash or spot markets that include futures prices as part of a reference price formula. Businesses that purchase beef as an input could also hedge beef price risk by purchasing live cattle futures contracts.

== Contract Description ==
Live cattle futures and options are traded on the Chicago Mercantile Exchange (CME), which introduced live cattle futures contracts in 1964. Contract prices are quoted in U.S. cents per pound. Minimum tick size for the contract is $0.00025 per pound ($10 per contract). Trading on the contract are subject to price limits of $0.03 per pound above or below the previous day's contract settlement price. Contracts expire in February, April, June, August, October, and December and 9 contracts are available at any time in order of expiry. For example, On June 5, 2020, contracts for June 2020, August 2020, October 2020, December 2020, February 2021, April 2021, June 2021, August 2021, October 2021 would be available for trading. For each contract, trading terminates at 12:00 Noon CT on the last business day of the delivery month, and deliveries may be made on any day of that month and the first eleven business days in the next calendar month, excluding that live graded deliveries may not be made prior to the ninth business day following the first Friday of the contract month and may not be made on Christmas Eve nor made on New Year’s Eve.

The deliverable assets for the contracts are 40,000 pounds of 65% Choice, 35% Select, Yield Grade 3 live steers or live heifers, as defined by the United States Department of Agriculture (USDA) "Official United States Standards for Grades of Slaughter Cattle", or producing 65% Choice, 35% Select, Yield Grade 3 steer or heifer carcasses, as defined by the same standard. All cattle must be born and raised exclusively in the United States, with no individual animal weighing less than 1,050 pounds or more than 1,500 pounds and no individual heifer weighing less than 1,050 pounds or more than 1,350 pounds. A delivery unit must consist entirely of steers or entirely of heifers.

Below are the current Contract Specifications for Live Cattle futures on the CME:

Contract Specification
Live Cattle	
Exchange:	CME
Sector	Meat
Tick Size:	0.00025
Tick Value:	10 USD
Denomination	USD
Decimal Place:	3

== Secondary Uses ==
Live cattle futures contract prices serves as a platform for cattle price discovery because futures markets are more publicly visible and accessible, due to lower transaction costs, for a larger number of buyers and sellers than the cash market. A larger number of buyers and sellers in the futures market allows those market participants to incorporate more demand and supply information, such as weather, disease, imports, exports, and world events, into the futures price compared with cash price.

Since 9 live cattle contracts are available at any time, prices of contracts with delivery dates in the future can produce forecasts of the spot price of cattle at those delivery times. On an absolute basis, forecasts produced from futures prices do not produce accurate price forecasts, but on a relative basis, those forecasts were found to be better than those produced by the USDA, university economists, statistical methods, and other forecasting sources.

Live cattle futures prices are also a part of both the Bloomberg Commodity Index and the S&P GSCI commodity index, which are benchmark indices widely followed in financial markets by traders and institutional investors. Its weighting in these commodity indices give live cattle futures prices non-trivial influence on returns on a wide range of investment funds and portfolios. Conversely, traders and investors have become non-trivial participants in the market for live cattle futures.

== Related Financial Instruments ==
A Brazilian Live Cattle futures contract also trades on B3 exchange. The contract is denoted in Brazilian reals and can be cash settled.

Derivatives on futures and derivatives on packages of futures contracts, such as options, calendar spread contracts, Trade-at-Settlement (TAS) contracts are also available for the CME live cattle futures contracts.

Live cattle futures contracts are often grouped together with feeder cattle and lean hogs futures contracts as livestock futures contracts. These commodities share many fundamental demand and supply risks, such long feeding periods, weather, feed prices, and consumer sentiment, which makes grouping them together useful for commercial discussions about both the commodities and their futures contracts. Commodity indices have followed this practice and grouped these futures contracts together in livestock futures contracts categories.

=== Gross Margin Financial Instruments ===
Cattle producers purchase feeder cattle to feed into live cattle or fat cattle for sale to slaughterhouses. Depending on the operation, producers purchase corn, soybean meal, and other commodities as feed. The difference between the selling price for live cattle and the costs of purchasing feeder cattle and feed (usually assumed to be corn, regardless of actual mix of feed used) is referred to as livestock gross margin (LGM), feeding margin, or cattle crush (as opposed to production margin, which also includes other production costs). Cattle producers can use existing futures contracts for feeder cattle and corn to fix those production cost components into the future. Traders can purchase those futures and the live cattle futures contract in particular ratios to profit from the difference of selling finished live cattle against the cost of buying the feeder cattle and feeding the cattle.

In addition to exchange-traded products, cattle producers can purchase livestock gross margin insurance policy contracts (LGM-Cattle) sponsored by the USDA Risk Management Agency from authorized crop insurance agents. These insurance policy contracts are bundles of exchange-traded options on futures contracts, and prices for these policy contracts refer to exchange-traded futures prices.
