= Spruce-pine-fir =

Classification of lumber commodities

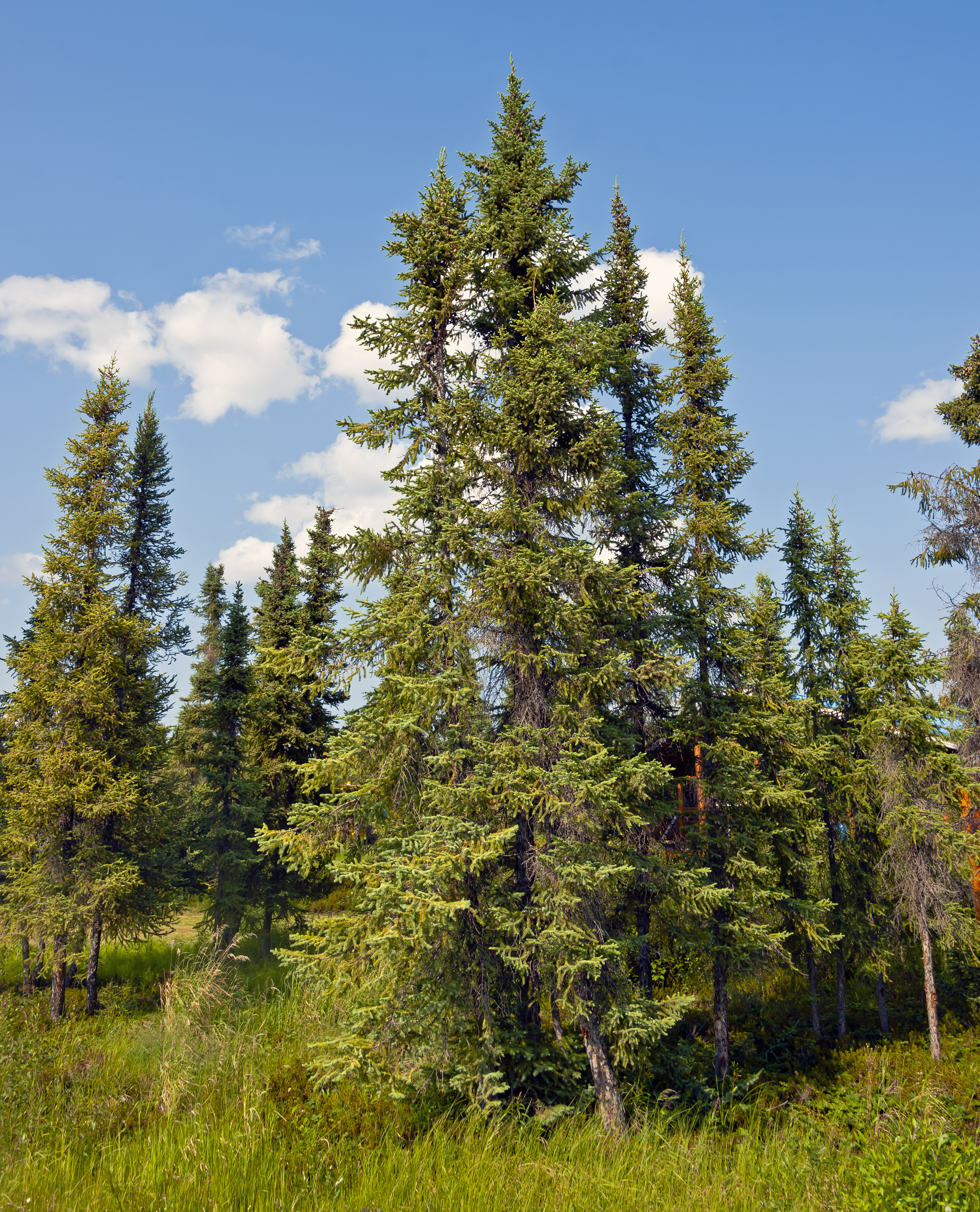
Black spruce stand at Arctic Chalet, Inuvik, NT

Spruce-pine-fir (SPF) is a classification of lumber that can be traded on commodities exchanges.

== Classification ==
In Canada, and parts of the United States, most of the spruce tree species, pine tree species, and fir tree species share similar physical and mechanical characteristics, to the point where lumber derived from any of these species are interchangeable for construction purposes. Therefore, it makes sense to harvest and process them together, and sell them as one product.

On some exchanges, there are different prices for Eastern and Western SPF varieties, and the price of Eastern SPF is generally higher than the price of Western SPF. When both types are sold together, the term Composite SPF is used. There is also utility-grade SPF, which is the lowest and cheapest grade.

Western SPF species generally grow faster and larger, but Eastern SPF species are generally stronger.

== Western SPF ==
Western SPF comes from the Canadian provinces of British Columbia and Alberta, and the US states of California, Idaho, Montana, Nevada, Oregon, Washington, and Wyoming.

It consists of the following species:

- White spruce (Picea glauca)
- Engelmann spruce (Picea engelmannii)
- Lodgepole pine (Pinus contorta)
- Alpine fir (Abies lasiocarpa)

Random-length lumber futures and options are traded on the Chicago Mercantile Exchange, and western SPF is the type of lumber specified in the trading specs. The term random length is used because even though all the boards are 2x4s, the lengths can be between 2.4 and 6.1 metres (8 and 20 ft).

== Eastern SPF ==
Eastern SPF comes from the Canadian provinces of Saskatchewan, Manitoba, Ontario, Quebec, New Brunswick, Nova Scotia, and Newfoundland and Labrador.

It consists of the following species:

- Black spruce (Picea mariana)
- Red spruce (Picea rubens)
- White spruce (Picea glauca)
- Jack pine (Pinus banksiana)
- Balsam fir (Abies balsamea)
