= Fed cattle =

Fed cattle ready to be sold

Fed cattle refers to cattle leaving a cattle feedlot, after fattening on a concentrated ration, that are ready to be sold to a packing plant for slaughter. Beef cattle are typically sold to packers at about 1,100 pounds, which yields a carcass weight of about 660 pounds.

== See also ==
- Feeder cattle
- Live cattle
