= Feeder cattle =

Young cattle being prepared for fattening

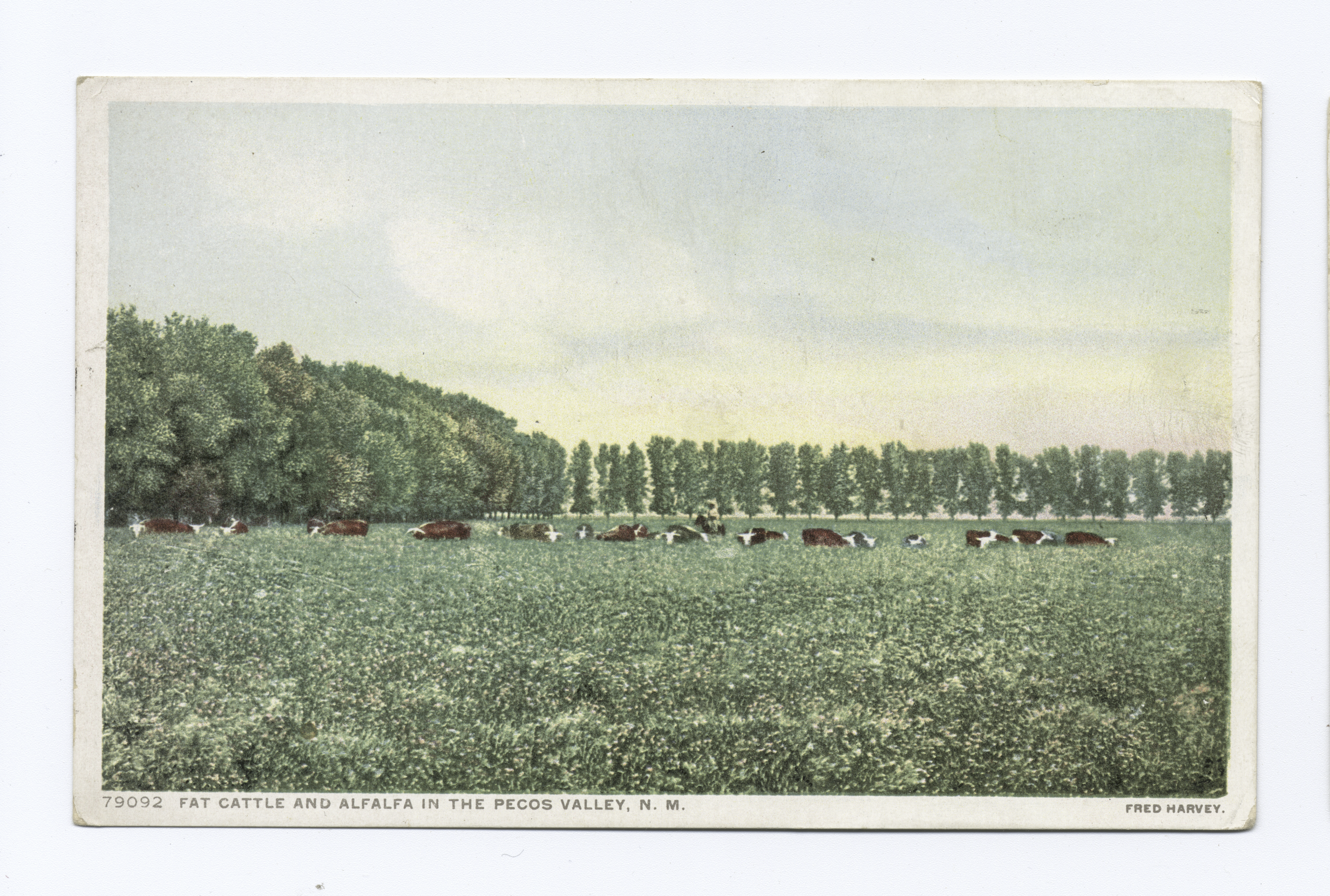
Fat cattle and alfalfa in the Pecos Valley, New Mexico (probably early 20th century)

"Prize fat cattle" (probably late 19th century)

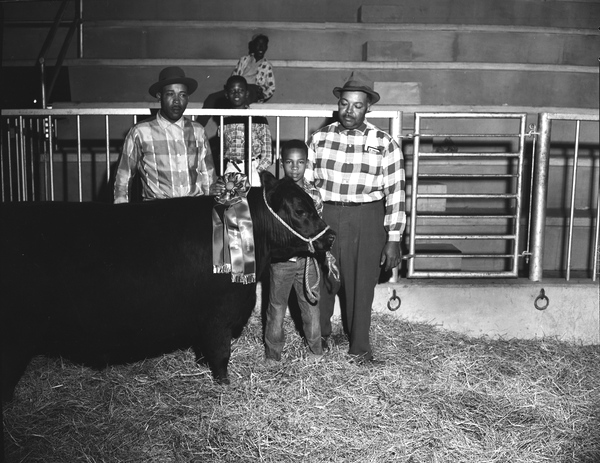
The Grand Champion steer at the 13th annual Fat Cattle Sale and Show in Quincy, Florida, 1959

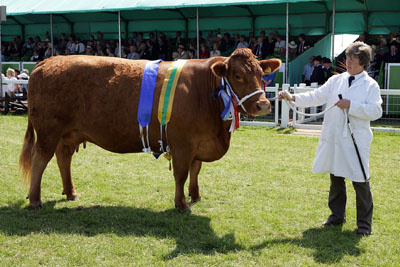
Foxhole Martha; 2005 Royal Cornwall Female Breed Champion

Feeder cattle, in some countries or regions called store cattle, are young cattle mature enough either to undergo backgrounding or to be fattened in preparation for slaughter. They may be steers (castrated males) or heifers (females who have not dropped a calf). The term often implicitly reflects an intent to sell to other owners for fattening (finishing). Backgrounding occurs at backgrounding operations, and fattening occurs at a feedlot. Feeder calves are less than 1 year old; feeder yearlings are between 1 and 2 years old. Both types are often produced in a cow-calf operation. After attaining a desirable weight, feeder cattle become finished cattle that are sold to a packer (finished cattle are also called fattened cattle, fat cattle, fed cattle, or, when contrasted with carcasses, live cattle). Packers slaughter the cattle and sell the meat in carcass boxed form.

Feedlots producing live cattle for slaughter will typically purchase 500–850 pounds (230–390 kg) feeder cattle calves and feed to grow the animals into 850–1,400 pounds (390–640 kg) cattle. Backgrounding operations will typically purchase 300–600 pounds (140–270 kg) feeder cattle calves and feed to grow the animals into 650–875 pounds (295–397 kg) backgrounded cattle. Backgrounding cattle that achieve weights of 650–700 pounds (290–320 kg) are suitable for sale to grass feeding operations, whereas those achieving weights of 800–825 pounds (363–374 kg) are suitable for sale to feedlot operators. Buyers of feeder cattle tend to look for high average gain (in weight) and low feed-to-gain ratio. Depending on circumstances, different feeder cattle buyers will look for different ranges of animal weight and grade.

Cattle producers and backgrounding operations balance feeder cattle prices, weights, time taken to fatten, death rates, and other feeder cattle factors against feed prices, live cattle prices, and other operating factors to profit from their operations.

== United States feeder cattle grades ==
The United States grades feeder cattle that have not reached an age of 36 months on three factors: frame size, thickness, and thriftiness.

- Frame size evaluates feeder cattle' height and body length as determined by their skeletal size in relation with their age; frame size affects the animals' mature size and weight gain composition as they are fed into fed cattle. A large framed feeder cattle of a given age, breed, and a given degree of thickness will gain more muscle and bone, and less fat, than a smaller framed animal with the same age, breed, and thickness at a given maturity age. In terms of United States Department of Agriculture (USDA) grades for cattle carcasses, at a given weight and thickness, large framed cattle (fed from large framed feeder cattle) will have carcasses with higher yield grades, but lower quality grades. If feeder cattle are fed to the same quality grade, Choice (0.50 inches (13 mm) fat at the twelfth rib) for example, large framed cattle of a given thickness have to be fed to heavier weights than smaller framed cattle of the same thickness. Age and breed modifies the precise sizes that segment this grade.
  - Large frame feeder cattle are tall and long-bodied for their age and breed, and steers and heifers of this frame, everything else being constant, are not expected to produce US Choice until they are fed to 1,250 pounds (570 kg) and 1,150 pounds (520 kg), respectively.
  - Medium frame feeder cattle are slightly tall and slightly long-bodied for their age and breed, and steers and heifers of this frame, everything else being constant, are not expected to produce US Choice until they are fed to 1,100 to 1,250 pounds (500 to 570 kg) and 1,000 to 1,150 pounds (450 to 520 kg), respectively.
  - Small frame feeder cattle are shorter and not as tall for their age and breed compared to medium frame feeder cattle, and steers and heifers of this frame, everything else being constant, are not expected to produce US Choice until they are fed to 1100 pounds and 1000 pounds, respectively.
- Thickness evaluates feeder cattle' muscle development in relation to skeletal size. Bone structure, muscling, and degree of fatness determines differences in thickness. Thicker cattle have higher ratios of muscle to bone. Thickness affects the animals' yield grade as they are fed into fed cattle, and a thick feeder cattle of a given age, breed, and frame size will produce a higher yield grade carcass, than a less thick animal of the same age, breed, and frame size at a given maturity age. If feeder cattle are fed to the same quality grade, Choice for example, thicker feeder cattle of a given thickness have to be fed to heavier weights than less thick feeder cattle of the same thickness. Age and breed modifies the precise sizes that segment this grade. Thickness are graded No. 1 to No. 4.
  - No. 1 thickness cattle must be at least moderately thick throughout their bodies, full in the forearm and the gaskin, and showing a rounded appearance through the back and the loin with moderate width between their legs.
  - No. 2. thickness cattle must be at least slightly thick throughout their bodies, full in the forearm and the gaskin, and showing a rounded appearance through the back and the loin with a slight width between their legs.
  - No. 3 thickness cattle must be at least thin through the forequarter and middle part of the rounds, their forearm and gaskin are thin and their backs and loins have a sunken appearance, and their both front and rear legs are set close together.
  - No. 4 thickness cattle include any cattle with even less thickness than the minimum requirements for No. 3 cattle. No. 1 thickness cattle typically show mostly beef breeding, No. 2 thickness cattle typically show high proportions of beef breeding and slight dairy breeding, and so on with lower thickness cattle.
- Thriftiness evaluates feeder cattle' overall health and expected performance in gaining weight to become a fed cattle. There are no strict guidelines as to grading thrift cattle, rather cattle with apparent health problems are graded as unthrifty and other cattle are categorized as thrifty.

The above three factors and their segmented categories combine to form individual grades. For examples, for thrifty cattle, the frame and thickness factors combine to form 12 different grades of thrifty cattle: No. 1; Large Frame, No. 2; Large Frame, No. 3; Large Frame, No. 4; Medium Frame, No. 1; Medium Frame, No. 2; Medium Frame, No. 3; Medium Frame, No. 4; Small Frame, No. 1; Small Frame, No. 2; Small Frame, No. 3; and finally Small Frame, No. 4.

== Cash market factors ==
Price to pay for feeder steers in order to receive average returns for labor, overhead and profit with assumed prices for fat cattle and feed, with typical feeding programs; U.S. Department of Agriculture

Health status, and visual indicators of health, can give feeder cattle premiums or discounts when sold in auctions. Feeder cattle with dead hair and mud are often sold at a discount, and those that are classified as "stale" are sold at a discount. Feeder cattle with other obvious physical indicators that would imply sickness are heavily discounted.

The primary sickness encountered in feeder cattle is respiratory sickness. Discounts on sick feeder cattle compensate for their increased risk of death, and lower performance in weight gain even if they recover. Cattle that look visually "thin" or "fleshy" are generally given discounts or premiums distinct from sickness discounts, as these visual traits do not necessarily indicate sickness and could be advantageous in particular feeding scenarios.

Some feeder cattle are sold with some pre-existing health maintenance programs. These programs may include weaning 21 to 45 days before sale, vaccinating for respiratory and digestive diseases, de-horning, castrating, implanting growth implants, treating for external and internal parasites, and starting to switch the feeder cattle to grain-based feed.

Lot size, or the number of feeder cattle for sale in a group, in relation to transportation available, weight, and sale location impact feeder cattle prices heavily. Price per weight increase with lot size and reach a maximum when lot sizes approaches truck-load sizes. As lot sizes exceed truck-load sizes, prices level off and eventually decrease. This represents fewer buyers and available transportation for larger lots of feeder cattle.

== Futures market trading ==
Feeder cattle futures contracts, traded on the Chicago Mercantile Exchange (CME), can be used to hedge and to speculate on the price of feeder cattle. Cattle producers can hedge future buying and selling prices for feeder cattle through trading feeder cattle futures, and such trading is a common part of a producer's risk management program. Production and marketing contracts for delivering feeder cattle in cash markets could also include feeder cattle futures prices as part of a reference price formula.

The contracts are for 50,000 pounds (23,000 kg) of feeder cattle, and call for cash settlement based on the CME Feeder Cattle Index. The minimum tick size for the contract is $0.00025 per pound ($12.50 per contract). Trading on the contract are subject to price limits of $0.045 per pound above or below the previous day's contract settlement price. If both of the first two listed contract months settle at limit, the daily price limits for all contract months shall expand to $0.0675 per pound on the next business day. If neither of the first two listed futures contract months settle at the expanded limit the next business day, daily price limits for all contract months shall revert to $0.045 per pound on the following business day. Feeder cattle futures are also traded on the CME Globex Exchange, below is the contract specifications for feeder cattle on the Globex exchange.

Contract Specs
Feeder cattle (FCA)	
Exchange:	Globex
Sector:	Meat
Tick size:	0.025
Tick value:	5 USD
BPV:	200
Denomination:	USD
Decimal place:	3

=== Final settlement based on CME Feeder Cattle Index ===
Feeder cattle futures contracts are cash settled based on the CME Feeder Cattle Index. The Index inputs are seven-day feeder cattle auction, direct trade, video sale, and Internet sale transaction prices for qualified steers publicly reported from the following twelve feeder cattle producing states: Colorado, Iowa, Kansas, Missouri, Montana, Nebraska, New Mexico, North Dakota, Oklahoma, South Dakota, Texas and Wyoming. Qualified steers must be between 700 and 899 pounds (318 and 408 kg), and be in either the Medium and Large Frame #1 or Medium and Large Frame #1–2 feeder cattle grades. Additionally, qualifying steers must not exhibit predominantly dairy, exotic, or Brahman breed characteristics, and must not have an origin outside of the US.

The CME Feeder Cattle Index is calculated using prices reported by USDA's Agricultural Marketing Service (AMS). AMS reports number of cattle sold, average price of sale, and average weight of cattle sold for daily feeder cattle transactions for every US state in 50 pounds (23 kg) segments for each grade segment. For example, separate average prices and average weight data are reported for the Medium and Large Frame #1 700–749 pound category, and for the Medium and Large Frame #1 750–799 pound category. The CME Feeder Cattle has eight qualifying reporting segment derived from its qualifying weight and grade standards: Medium & Large #1 steers weighing 700–749 pounds, Medium & Large #1 steers weighing 750–799 pounds, Medium & Large #1 steers weighing 800–849 pounds, Medium & Large #1 steers weighing 849–899 pounds, Medium & Large #1–#2 steers weighing 700–749 pounds, Medium & Large #1–#2 steers weighing 750–799 pounds, Medium & Large #1–#2 steers weighing 800–849 pounds, and Medium & Large #1–#2 steers weighing 849–899 pounds.

The CME Feeder Cattle Index is calculated through the following steps:

1. The number of cattle sold is multiplied by the average weight of feeder cattle sold within each qualifying 50 pound grade category to produce "Total Pounds Sold" for that category
2. The number of cattle sold is multiplied by the average weight and the average price of feeder cattle sold to produce the "Total Dollars Sold" for that category
3. "Total Pounds Sold" are added together from the eight qualifying reporting categories of each report, and then reports from all 12 states for the last seven days are added together to produce an aggregated figure
4. "Total Dollars Sold" are added together from the eight qualifying reporting categories of each report, and then reports from all 12 states for the last seven days are added together to produce an aggregated figure
5. The aggregated "Total Dollars Sold" is divided by the "Total Pounds Sold" to produce an average dollar paid per pound price, which then becomes the CME Feeder Cattle Index figure

Qualifying cattle sold with certain minor notes are also included in the CME Feeder Cattle Index.

=== Related derivatives ===
Derivatives on futures and derivatives on packages of futures contracts, such as options, calendar spread contracts, Trade-at-Settlement (TAS) contracts are also available for feeder cattle futures contracts.

Feeder cattle futures prices are a part of the S&P GSCI commodity index, which is a benchmark index widely followed in financial markets by traders and institutional investors. Its weighting in S&P GSCI give feeder cattle futures prices non-trivial influence on returns on a wide range of investment funds and portfolios. Conversely, traders and investors have become non-trivial participants in the market for feeder cattle futures. The CME offers a S&P GSCI Commodity Index futures contract for trading.

Feeder cattle futures contracts are often grouped together with live cattle and lean hogs futures contracts as livestock futures contracts. These commodities share many fundamental demand and supply risks, such long feeding periods, weather, feed prices, and consumer sentiment, which makes grouping them together useful for commercial discussions about both the commodities and their futures contracts. Commodity indices have followed this practice and grouped these futures contracts together in livestock futures contracts categories.

==== Gross Margin Financial Instruments ====
Cattle producers purchase feeder cattle to feed into live cattle or fed cattle for sale to slaughterhouses. Depending on the operation, producers purchase corn, soybean meal, and other commodities as feed. The difference between the selling price for live cattle and the costs of purchasing feeder cattle and feed (usually assumed to be corn, regardless of actual mix of feed used) is referred to as livestock gross margin (LGM), feeding margin, or cattle crush (as opposed to production margin, which also includes other production costs). Cattle producers can use existing futures contracts for feeder cattle and corn to fix those production cost components into the future. Traders can purchase those futures and the live cattle futures contract in particular ratios to profit from the difference of selling finished live cattle against the cost of buying the feeder cattle and feeding the cattle.

In addition to exchange-traded products, cattle producers can purchase livestock gross margin insurance policy contracts (LGM-Cattle) sponsored by the USDA Risk Management Agency from authorized crop insurance agents. These insurance policy contracts are bundles of exchange-traded options on futures contracts, and prices for these policy contracts refer to exchange-traded futures prices.
