= Delivery month =

Physical delivery contract specification

For futures contracts specifying physical delivery, the delivery month is the month in which the seller must deliver, and the buyer must accept and pay for, the underlying. For contracts specifying cash settlement, the delivery month is the month of a final mark-to-market. The exact dates of acceptable delivery vary considerably and will be specified by the exchange in the futures contract specifications.

For most futures contracts, at any given time, one contract will typically be traded much more actively than others. This is called variously the front month or the top step contract.

Financial contracts traded on US futures exchanges (such as bonds, short-term interest rates, foreign exchange, and US stock indexes) typically expire quarterly, specifically in March, June, September, and December. However, for financial contracts traded on non-US futures exchanges, the expiration schedule may not follow a quarterly pattern.

== Codes ==
This table lists the conventional letter codes used in tickers to specify delivery month:

Month codes
Month	Code
January	F
February	G
March	H
April	J
May	K
June	M
July	N
August	Q
September	U
October	V
November	X
December	Z

To name a specific contract in a financial futures market, the month code will follow the contract code, and in turn be followed by the year. For example, CLZ3 is the December 2023 NYMEX crude oil contract. CL denotes crude oil (crude light), Z corresponds to the December delivery month, and 3 refers to 2023.
