= Dubai Mercantile Exchange =

Commodity exchange for crude oil futures

Dubai Mercantile Exchange (DME)
- Type: Joint Venture
- Industry: Commodities Exchange
- Founded: 2007
- Headquarters: Dubai, United Arab Emirates
- Website: Official website

The Dubai Mercantile Exchange (DME) is a commodity exchange based in Dubai currently listing its flagship futures contract, DME Oman Crude Oil Futures Contract (OQD). Launched in 2007, the DME aims to become the crude oil pricing benchmark for the Asian market with its Oman Crude Oil contract, like the Intercontinental Exchange’s (ICE) North Sea Brent is to Europe and the New York Mercantile Exchange’s (NYMEX) West Texas Intermediate is to North America.

The Dubai Mercantile Exchange announced that it will officially change its name to Gulf Mercantile Exchange (GME) effective September 2, 2024.

The choice of the OQD contract as a benchmark was due to several important attributes of the crude oil itself and its infrastructure as opposed to the volume of export in comparison with other Middle East crudes. Firstly, the Omani crude oil is not subject to OPEC production quotas and/or cuts, nor is it subject to destination restrictions. Secondly, the geographical location of the export port Mina al Fahal (operated by Petroleum Development Oman - PDO), in Muscat into the Gulf of Oman, is past the Strait of Hormuz. Other reasons such as the increasing long-term production levels and investments, as well as the quality of the crude, helped tip the balance in favor of that crude to be used as a benchmark.

The DME is located in the Dubai International Financial Center (DIFC), (a financial free zone in Dubai), and is regulated by the Dubai Financial Services Authority. The US Commodity Futures Trading Commission (CFTC) issued a "No Action Letter" in 2007, allowing US customers to trade DME contracts. The DME has received further regulatory approval in 23 jurisdictions.

== Company Evolution ==
The exchange was initially started in 2005, when Tatweer and NYMEX signed a Joint Venture Agreement to launch a commodities exchange in the Middle East. The following year, Oman’s Ministry of Oil and Gas (MOG) announced that the Omani crude oil’s official selling price (OSP) exported through PDO would be set according to the DME Oman Crude Oil Futures contract. In the first half of 2007, Oman Investment Fund (OIF) acquired a stake in the DME, which was launched on 1 June of that year.

Two major events in 2008 that notably changed the DME’s shareholding structure; several trading firms and international financial institutions, namely Concord Energy, Goldman Sachs, JPMorgan Chase, Morgan Stanley, Shell and Vitol, became shareholders of the DME, and NYMEX was acquired by the CME Group.

The acquisition of NYMEX by the CME Group greatly impacted the DME. Until the DME migration to the electronic trading platform CME Globex in 2009, DME futures used to be traded on DME Direct, an electronic platform designed by NYMEX specifically for the DME. The switch to one of the leading platforms, CME Globex, in February 2009 has helped make the access to the DME contracts easier for market participants, as all three benchmarks (WTI, Brent and DME Oman) can be traded on the same electronic platform.
Another boost for the DME in 2009 was the announcement by the Dubai Department of Petroleum Affairs (DPA) in switching their pricing formula to the forward public OSP based on the DME contract. That meant that the Dubai crude oil selling price would become:

OSPᴍ = DME Oman (ᴍ-2) ± differential

In December 2010, NYMEX announced the launch of six DME Oman-linked contracts to complement the availability of trading instruments so as to help establish the benchmark.

== Futures Contract ==
The DME’s flagship contract is the Oman Crude Oil Futures Contract, launched on 1 June 2007, which became the largest physically delivered crude oil contract in the region. The physical settlement of the contract gives it a unique aspect whereby the front trading month is two months forward (e.g.: the March contract is the front month during January trading).

Total number of barrels traded per year on the Dubai Mercantile Exchange through the Oman Crude Oil Futures Contract:

2007*	200,892,000 barrels
2008	322,294,000 barrels
2009	551,866,000 barrels
2010	744,727,000 barrels

* the exchanged opened on 1 June 2007. 1,000 barrels = 1 lot (or contract). Figures are from the DME website

With over 144 million barrels delivered through the exchange in 2010 and more than 50 companies trading the contract regularly, it seems that the DME Oman oil benchmark has been accepted by market participants as a regulated and transparent benchmark for the East of Suez market.

== See also ==
- CME Group
- Chicago Mercantile Exchange
- NYMEX
- DME Oman Crude Oil Futures Contract
- Commodity Futures Trading Commission
- Dubai Financial Services Authority
- Petroleum Development Oman
- List of futures exchanges
- List of traded commodities
