= Lean Hog =

Financial livestock product

Lean Hog is a type of hog (pork) futures contract that can be used to hedge and to speculate on pork prices in the US.

Lean Hog futures and options are traded on the Chicago Mercantile Exchange (CME), which introduced Lean Hog futures contracts in 1966. The contracts are for 40,000 pounds of Lean Hogs, and call for cash settlement based on the CME Lean Hog Index, which is a two-day weighted average of cash markets. Minimum tick size for the contract is $0.00025 per pound, with each tick valued at $10 USD. Trades on the contract are subject to price limits of $0.0375 per pound above or below the previous day's contract settlement price, with an exception that there shall be no daily price limits in the expiring month contract during the last 2 Trading Days.

Below are the Contract Specifications for Lean Hog futures on the CME:

Contract Specification
Lean Hogs (LHA)	
Exchange:	CME
Sector:	Meat
Tick Size:	0.00025
Tick Value:	10USD
BPV:	400
Denomination:	USD
Decimal Place:	3

Lean Hog futures prices are widely used by U.S. pork producers as reference prices in marketing contracts for selling their hogs. Usage of marketing contracts tied to pork futures prices are correlated, and tend to increase, with the size of the producer. In addition, hog producers often trade pork futures contracts directly as part of a risk management program.

Lean Hog futures prices are also a part of both the Bloomberg Commodity Index and the S&P GSCI commodity index, which are benchmark indices widely followed in financial markets by traders and institutional investors. Its weighting in these commodity indices give Lean Hog futures prices non-trivial influence on returns on a wide range of investment funds and portfolios. Conversely, traders and investors have become non-trivial participants in the market for Lean Hog futures.

Lean hog futures contracts are often grouped together with feeder cattle and live cattle futures contracts as livestock futures contracts. These commodities share many fundamental demand and supply risks, such long feeding periods, weather, feed prices, and consumer sentiment toward meat consumption, which makes grouping them together useful for commercial discussions about both the commodities and their futures contracts. Commodity indices have followed this practice and grouped these futures contracts together in livestock futures contracts categories.

== See also ==
- Feeder cattle
- Live cattle
- Pork belly
