= CME SPAN =

The Standard Portfolio Analysis of Risk (SPAN) is a system for calculating margin requirements for futures and options on futures. It was developed by the Chicago Mercantile Exchange in 1988.

SPAN is a portfolio margining method that uses grid simulation. It calculates the likely loss in a set of derivative positions (also called a portfolio), and sets this value as the initial margin payable by the firm holding the portfolio. In this manner, SPAN provides for offsets between correlated positions and enhances margining efficiency.
