= Chicago Butter and Egg Board =

Commodity exchange

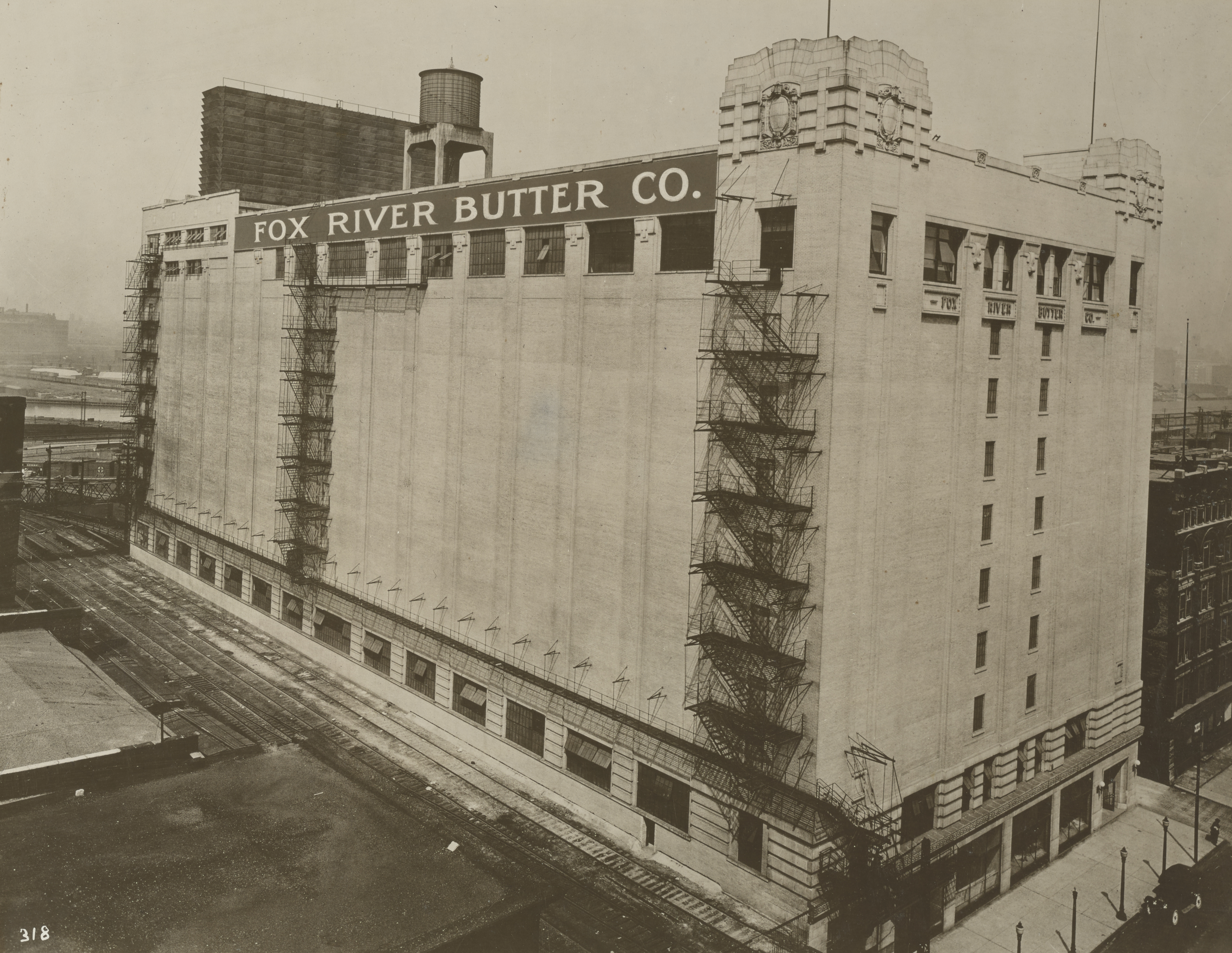
Fox River Butter company building in Chicago

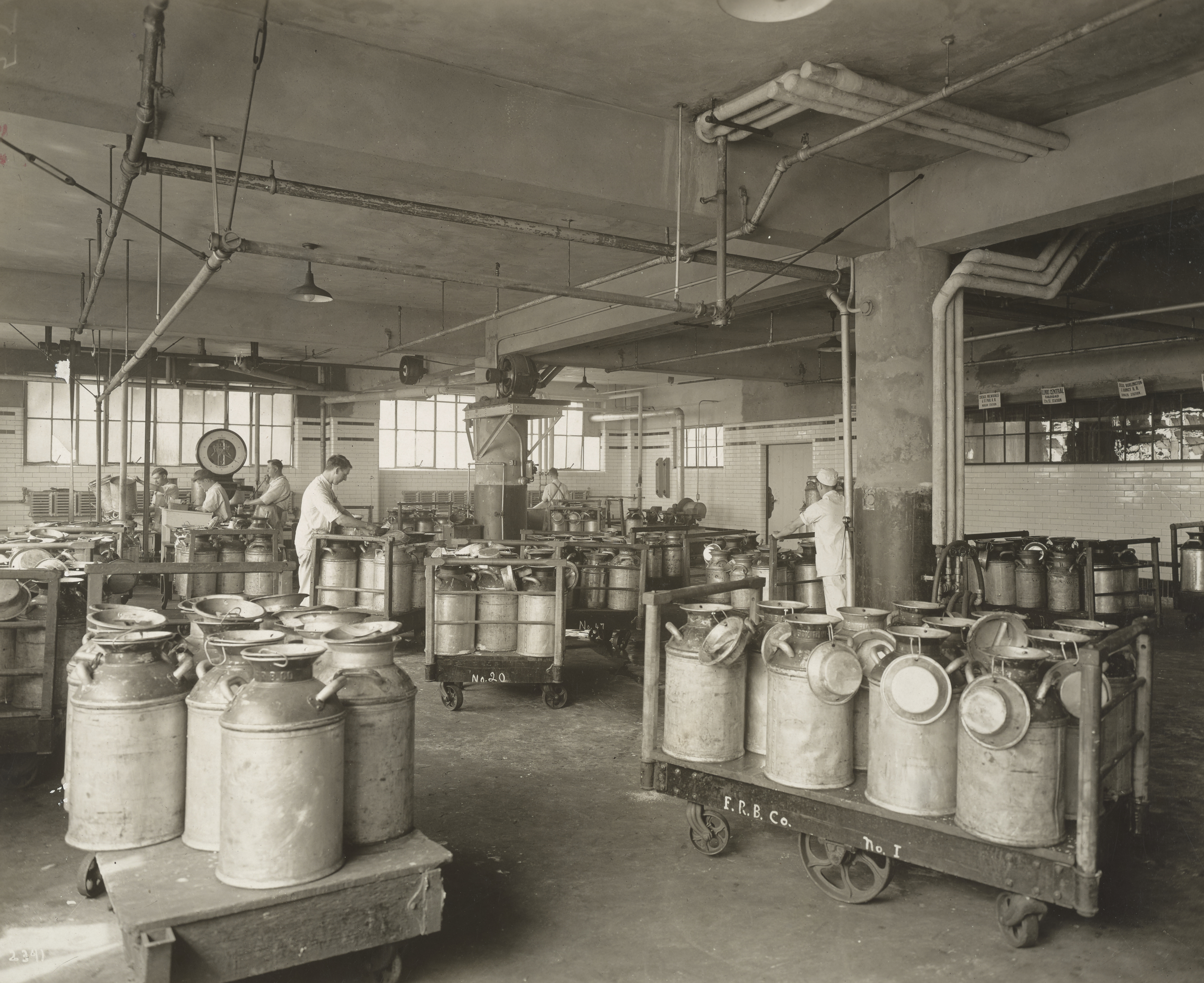
Cream receiving at the Fox River Butter Co, World War I

The Chicago Butter and Egg Board, founded in 1898, was a spin-off entity of the Chicago Produce Exchange. In the year 1919, it was re-organized as the Chicago Mercantile Exchange (CME). Roots of the Chicago Butter and Egg Board are traceable to the 19th century.

Initially, the Chicago Butter and Egg Board traded only two types of contracts, butter and eggs. Over several decades, it evolved into the CME which traded futures contracts and options contracts on over 50 products, from pork bellies to eurodollars and stock market indices.

The butter and egg markets died out in the 1960s after the production of both commodities had become much less seasonal, which reduced both the price volatility and the need for inter-temporal signals for guiding the disposal of inventories.

== Background ==
The United States was experiencing significant population growth in the late 19th century, but periods of food scarcity continued. Markets were not yet well organized, refrigeration had not been invented and production was still governed by seasonal cycles. Butter was salted and stored for later use. By 1915 the Butter and Egg Board had developed 28 rules for butter grading.

== Formation ==
The Chicago Butter and Egg Board was formed in 1898 out of the Chicago Produce Exchange. Time contracts were only a small part of the Board's activity and early attempts to implement margin rules were controversial. When futures trading rules were finally put in place in 1919 the Board's mandate expanded to include futures trading, eventually giving way to the CME which began trading butter and eggs on December 1, 1919.
