= New York Mercantile Exchange =

American futures exchange

Coordinates: 40°42′52″N 74°1′1″W

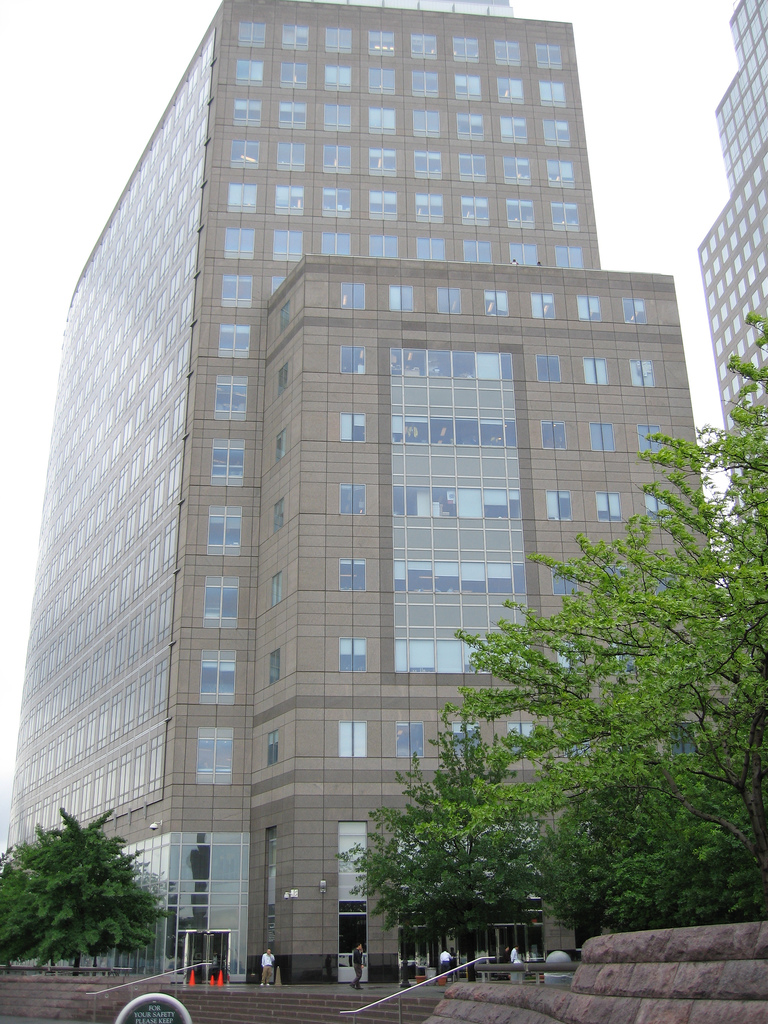
- Type: Subsidiary
- Founded: 1882; 144 years ago
- Headquarters: One North End Avenue; Manhattan, New York City 10285; United States
- Parent: CME Group
- Website: nymex.com

The New York Mercantile Exchange (NYMEX) is a commodity futures exchange owned and operated by CME Group of Chicago. NYMEX is located at One North End Avenue in Brookfield Place in the Battery Park City section of Manhattan, New York City.

The company's two principal divisions are the New York Mercantile Exchange and Commodity Exchange, Inc. (COMEX), once separately owned exchanges. NYMEX traces its history to 1882 and for most of its history, as was common of exchanges, it was owned by the members who traded there. Later, NYMEX Holdings, Inc., the former parent company of the New York Mercantile Exchange and COMEX, went public and became listed on the New York Stock Exchange on November 17, 2006, under the ticker symbol NMX. On March 17, 2008, Chicago based CME Group signed a definitive agreement to acquire NYMEX Holdings, Inc. for $11.2 billion in cash and stock and the takeover was completed in August 2008. Both NYMEX and COMEX now operate as designated contract markets (DCM) of the CME Group. The other two designated contract markets in the CME Group are the Chicago Mercantile Exchange and the Chicago Board of Trade.

The New York Mercantile Exchange handles billions of dollars' worth of oil transactions, energy carriers, metals, and other commodities being bought and sold on the trading floor and the overnight electronic trading computer systems for future delivery. The prices quoted for transactions on the exchange are the basis for prices that people pay for various commodities throughout the world.

The floor of the NYMEX is regulated by the Commodity Futures Trading Commission, an independent agency of the United States government. Each individual company that trades on the exchange must send its own independent brokers. Therefore, a few employees on the floor of the exchange represent a big corporation and the exchange employees only record the transactions and have nothing to do with the actual trade.

Although mostly electronic since 2006, the NYMEX maintained a small venue, or "pit", that still practiced the open outcry trading system, in which traders employed shouting and complex hand gestures on the physical trading floor. A project to preserve the hand signals used at NYMEX has been published. NYMEX closed the pit permanently at the end of trading Friday, December 30, 2016, because of shrinking volume.

== Early history ==
Former buildings

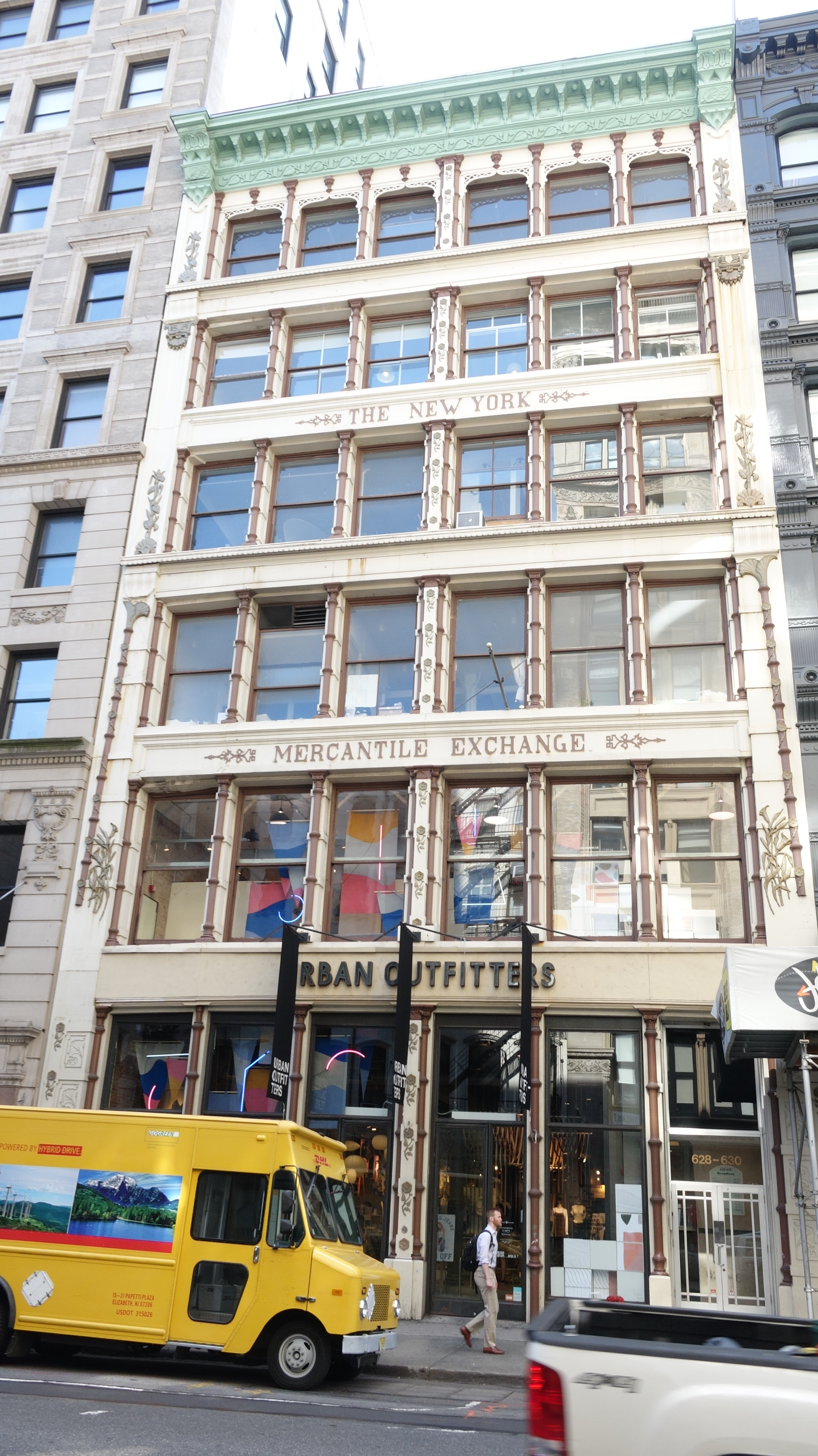
628 Broadway between Bleecker and Houston Streets, built in 1882 and designed by H.J. Schwarzmann

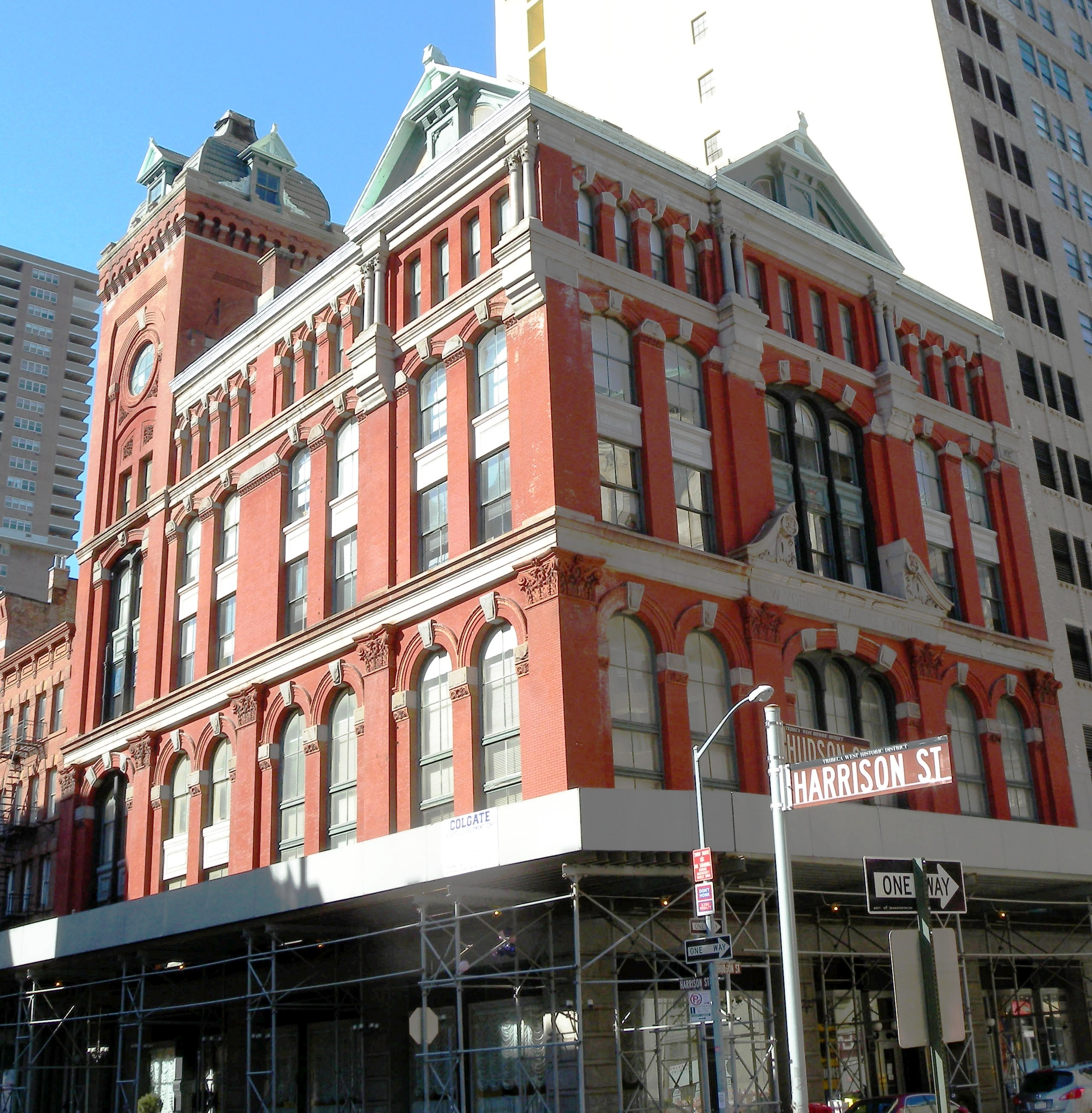
6 Harrison Street at Hudson Street, the exchange's headquarters from 1885 to 1977

Commodity exchanges began in the middle of the 19th century, when businessmen began organizing market forums to make buying and selling of commodities easier. These marketplaces provided a place for buyers and sellers to set the quality, standards, and establish rules of business. By the late 19th century there were about 1,600 marketplaces at ports and railroad stations. In 1872, a group of Manhattan dairy merchants got together and created the Butter and Cheese Exchange of New York. They were trying to bring order and standardization to the chaotic conditions that existed in their industry. Soon, egg trade became part of the business conducted on the exchange and the name was modified to the Butter, Cheese, and Egg Exchange. In 1882, the name finally changed to the New York Mercantile Exchange when opening trade to dried fruits, canned goods, and poultry.

As centralized warehouses were built into principal market centers such as New York and Chicago in the early 20th century, exchanges in smaller cities began to disappear giving more business to the exchanges such as the NYMEX in bigger cities. In 1933, the COMEX was established through the merger of four smaller exchanges; the National Metal Exchange, the Rubber Exchange of New York, the National Raw Silk Exchange, and the New York Hide Exchange. Through the 1970s, 80's and 90's COMEX, NYMEX, and other exchanges shared a single trading floor in 4 World Trade Center.

=== Goods ===
For years, the NYMEX traders had done a large business trading futures of Maine's potato crop. According to Leah McGrath Goodman's 2011 book The Asylum, manipulation in this market was commonplace, performed by various parties including potato inspectors and NYMEX traders. The worst incident was the 1970s potato bust, when Idaho potato magnate J. R. Simplot allegedly went short in huge numbers, leaving a large amount of contracts unsettled at the expiration date, resulting in a large number of defaulted delivery contracts. A public outcry followed, and the newly created Commodity Futures Trading Commission held hearings. NYMEX was barred not only from continuing to trade in potato futures, but from entering any new area in which it hadn't traded before. NYMEX's reputation was severely damaged, because, as future chairman Michel Marks told Goodman in his book, "The essence of an exchange is the sanctity of its contract."

When the potato ban came into effect, NYMEX's platinum, palladium and heating oil markets were not significantly affected. However, NYMEX's reputation suffered in Washington, D.C., especially with the regulations in the Commodity Futures Trading Commission (CFTC), the president of the exchange, Richard Leone brought in John Elting Treat, White House energy adviser to Presidents Carter and Reagan to help restore the credibility of NYMEX and to help the exchange explore the possibility of entering the petroleum market recognizing the great potential for moving well beyond the limited size of the New York Heating Oil market. When Leone left NYMEX in 1981 as a result of a strong disagreement with the NYMEX board, John Elting Treat was asked to replace him as president. The launching of the WTI crude oil contract was championed by Treat, who, with difficulty, convinced the board and the two Marks family members, veteran and highly respected floor trader Francis Marks and his son, Michael, who had just become chairman of the board, to take a chance on trading crude oil. Arnold Safir was one of the members of an advisory committee formed by Treat to help design the new contract. Treat, with Board Chairman Marks and the support of the rest of the NYMEX board, eventually chose West Texas Intermediate (WTI) as the traded product and Cushing, Oklahoma, as the delivery point. Robin Woodhead, who later became the first chairman of the International Petroleum Exchange (IPE) in London started an active dialogue with Treat about whether they could start a Brent Crude oil contracts. Treat was very supportive and gave Woodhead strong support and a lot of advice. Shortly thereafter, after substantial conversations, The IPE was formally launched and started trading Brent.

Treat and his research staff then began looking for other oil products to trade. Gasoline was clearly next on the product list but there was a lot of debate about where the delivery point should be. The Gulf Coast was the easiest, but the exchange also looked at California markets, but decided they wouldn't work. Treat then started looking simultaneously at launching crude and later products options contracts. He found that the existing NYMEX floor traders didn't have the mathematical skills necessary to trade options, so the exchange offered financial inducements to get members of the American Stock Exchange's options traders to come over and trade options on petroleum futures. Under Treat's leadership, NYMEX also began to research the potential for trading natural gas and electricity, but focused first on natural gas. Product quality of natural gas was not an issue in that market, but the delivery point was a more difficult choice.

After launching the original crude oil futures contract, Treat began an aggressive marketing campaign to first bring in the large US and British oil companies and then moved on to pull in the large Middle East producers. It took almost a year to get the first US "majors" to start trading, but several "majors" did not start for almost 5 years. The initial resistance from the OPEC producers was almost impossible to break through, although some finally gave in, among the first being Venezuela. The rumors on the floor at that time were the Arab producers would trade gold futures as a proxy for oil prices (since the Arabs were major purchasers of gold and would buy more when their pockets were filled by rising oil prices, and conversely sell when oil revenues fell and reduced their ability to buy gold).

After the potato ban, NYMEX's existence was in doubt. Most of the trading volume had been in potatoes. Without a good commodity, the traders had trouble making money. Eventually, the new chairman, Michel Marks – the son of commodities icon Francis Q. Marks – along with economist Arnold Safer, figured out that NYMEX could revamp an old heating oil futures contract. When the government deregulated heating oil, the contract had a chance of becoming a good object of trade on the floor. A new futures contract was carefully drawn up and trading began on a tiny scale in 1978. Some of the first users of NYMEX heating oil deliveries were small scale suppliers of people in the Northern United States.

NYMEX's business threatened some entrenched interests like big oil and government groups like OPEC that had traditionally controlled oil prices. NYMEX provided an "open market" and thus transparent pricing for heating oil, and, eventually, crude oil, gasoline, and natural gas. NYMEX's oil futures contracts were standardized for the delivery of West Texas Intermediate light, sweet crude oil to Cushing.

=== Growth ===
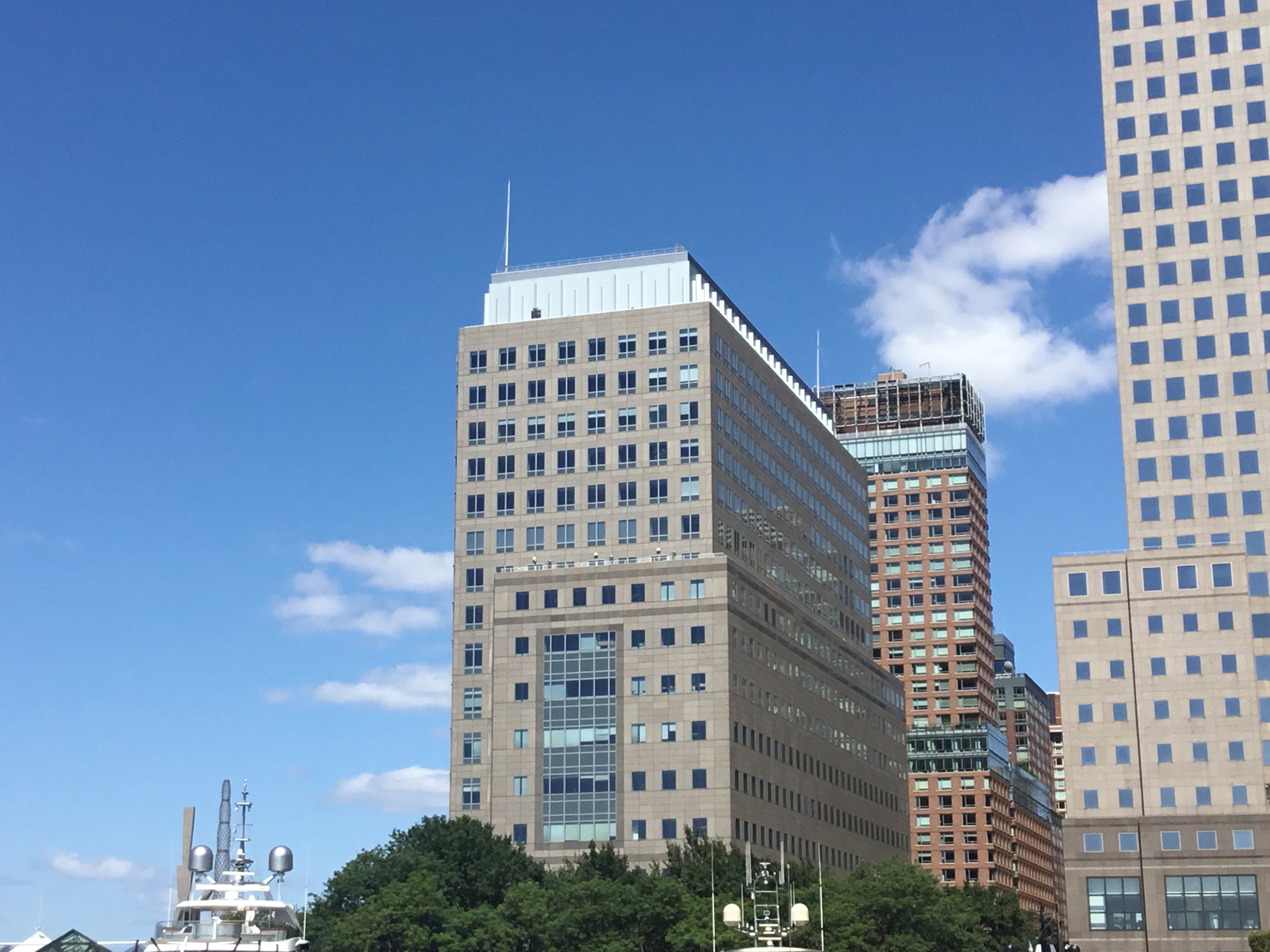
New York Mercantile Exchange in September 2021

The energy trading business took off, and NYMEX boomed. The open outcry floor became a cacophony of shouting traders and pit cards. The pits became a place where many people without much education or ability to fit into Wall Street could have a chance at being rich. Goodman's book tells the stories of many of the personalities that built the exchange in this era.

COMEX (Commodity Exchange, Inc), one of the exchanges that shared 4 World Trade Center with NYMEX, had traditionally looked down on NYMEX for being smaller and for having the toxic reputation from the potato bust. With NYMEX's energy trading boom, it became much larger and wealthier than COMEX. On August 3, 1994, the NYMEX and COMEX finally merged under the NYMEX name. By the late 1990s, there were more people working on the NYMEX floor than there was space for them. In 1997, the NYMEX moved to a new building on the Southwestern portion of Manhattan, part of a complex called the World Financial Center. In 2014 the buildings were renamed to Brookfield Place.

== Later history ==
=== September 11, 2001, attacks ===
The NYBOT's original headquarters and trading floor were destroyed in the September 11, 2001, terrorist attacks on the World Trade Center. Several NYMEX people were lost in the tragedy, even though the new NYMEX building itself was mostly undamaged. Despite the area's devastation, the exchange's management and staff quickly had the exchange working.

The WTC/WFC art gallery, long located in the Nymex building, continued showing world and community art until 2012. The last-ever exhibit there was a solo show by actualist painter Terry Ward.

On February 26, 2003, the New York Board of Trade (NYBOT) signed a lease agreement with the NYMEX to move into its World Financial Center headquarters and trading facility. NYMEX maintained a close relationship with many organizations and people at World Trade Center, and, after the attacks, the NYMEX built a $12 million trading floor backup facility outside of New York City with 700 traders' booths, 2,000 telephones, and a backup computer system. This backup was in case of another terrorist attack or natural disaster in Lower Manhattan.

=== Electronic trading ===
NYMEX held a virtual monopoly on "open market" oil futures trading (as opposed to the "dark market" or over-the-counter market). However, in the early 2000s the electronically based exchanges started taking away the business of the open outcry markets like NYMEX. Enron's online energy trading system was part of this trend. Jeff Sprecher's Intercontinental Exchange, or ICE, was another example. ICE eventually began trading oil contracts that were extremely similar to NYMEX's, taking away market share almost immediately.

The open outcry NYMEX pit traders had always been against electronic trading because it threatened their income and their lifestyle. The executives at NYMEX felt that electronic trading was the only way to keep the exchange competitive. NYMEX teamed up with the Chicago Mercantile Exchange to use Globex in 2006. The trading pits emptied out as many traders quit. Banks, hedge funds, and huge oil companies stopped making telephone calls to the pits and started trading directly for themselves over screens.

In this period the NYMEX also worked on founding the Dubai Mercantile Exchange in the United Arab Emirates. This was chronicled by Ben Mezrich in his New York Times Best Selling book Rigged which has been optioned for film adaptation by Summit Entertainment.

=== Sell-off ===
The final executive management of NYMEX decided to sell it off in pieces, take golden parachute buyouts, and leave. In 2006 NYMEX underwent an initial public offering (IPO) and was listed on the New York Stock Exchange. The executives and exchange members owning seats on the exchange saw their net worth increase by millions of dollars in a few hours - many of the pit traders, who leased their seats instead of owning, did not. Other parts of NYMEX were sold to private equity investors and the Chicago Mercantile Exchange. The CME got ownership of the physical facilities and began scrubbing the NYMEX logo and name off of various artifacts and closed the NYMEX museum. NYMEX eventually became little more than a brand name used by CME. By 2011, NYMEX open outcry trading was relegated for the most part to a small number of people trading options.

In 2009 it was reported that holders of COMEX gold futures contracts experienced problems taking delivery of their metal. Along with chronic delivery delays, some investors received delivery of bars not matching their contract in serial number and weight. The delays could not be easily explained by slow warehouse movements, as the daily reports of these movements showed little activity. Because of these problems, there were concerns that COMEX did not have the gold inventory to back its existing warehouse receipts.

== Trading platforms ==
- Pit (open outcry)
- Electronic trading (Globex)

== Commodities traded ==
NYMEX Division

- Coal
- Crude oil
- Electricity
- Gasoline
- Heating oil
- Natural gas
- Palladium
- Platinum
- Propane
- Uranium

COMEX Division

- Aluminum
- Copper
- Gold
- Silver

== See also ==
- Commodity Exchange Act
- Energy law
- New York Cotton Exchange
- List of futures exchanges
- List of traded commodities
- RBOB - (Reformulated Blendstock for Oxygenate Blending)
