= Chicago Mercantile Exchange =

American financial and commodity derivative exchange

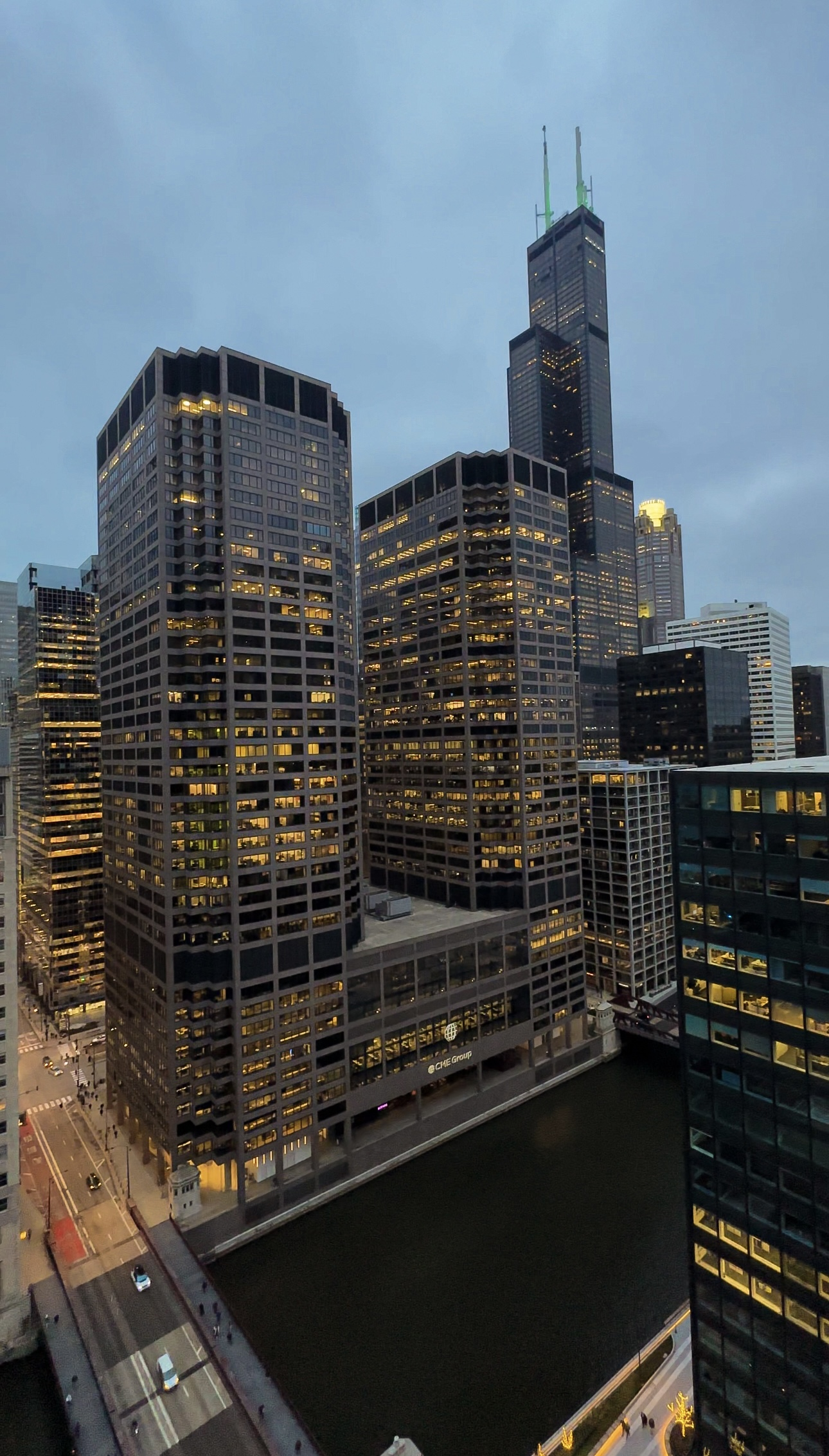
- Chicago Mercantile Exchange Center
- Type: Subsidiary
- Industry: Business services
- Founded: 1898; 128 years ago
- Headquarters: Chicago, Illinois, U.S.
- Products: Futures and options
- Parent: CME Group, Incorporated
- Website: cmegroup.com

The Chicago Mercantile Exchange (CME; often called "the Chicago Merc", or "the Merc") is an American derivatives marketplace based in Chicago, Illinois, and located at 20 South Wacker Drive.

The CME was founded in 1898 as the Chicago Butter and Egg Board, an agricultural commodities exchange. For most of its history, the exchange was in the then-common form of a nonprofit organization, owned by members of the exchange. The Merc demutualized in November 2000, went public in December 2002, and merged with the Chicago Board of Trade in July 2007 to become a designated contract market of the CME Group Inc., which operates both markets. The chairman and chief executive officer of CME Group is Terrence A. Duffy, Bryan Durkin is president. On August 18, 2008, shareholders approved a merger with the New York Mercantile Exchange (NYMEX) and COMEX. CME, CBOT, NYMEX, and COMEX are now markets owned by CME Group. After the merger, the value of the CME quadrupled in a two-year span, with a market cap of over $25 billion.

Today, CME is the largest options and futures contracts open interest (number of contracts outstanding) exchange of any futures exchange in the world. The Merc trades several types of financial instruments: interest rates, equities, currencies, and commodities.

CME also pioneered the CME SPAN software that is used around the world as the official performance bond (margin) mechanism of 50 registered exchanges, clearing organizations, service bureaus, and regulatory agencies throughout the world.

== Trading platforms ==
Trading is conducted in two methods; an open outcry format and the CME Globex electronic system. More than 90 percent of total volume at the exchange occurs electronically on CME Globex.

=== Open outcry ===
Operating during regular trading hours (RTH), the open outcry method consists of floor traders standing in a trading pit to call out orders, prices, and quantities of a particular commodity or its derivatives. Different colored jackets are worn by the traders to indicate what firm they are a part of. In addition, complex hand signals (called Arb) are used. These hand signals were first used in the 1970s. Today, however, headsets are also used by the brokers to communicate with the traders. The pits are areas of the floor that are lowered to facilitate communication, somewhat like a miniature amphitheater. The pits can be raised and lowered depending on trading volume. To an onlooker, the open outcry system can look chaotic and confusing, but in reality, the system is a tried and true method of accurate and efficient trading. An illustrated project to record the hand signal language used in CME's trading pits has been compiled.

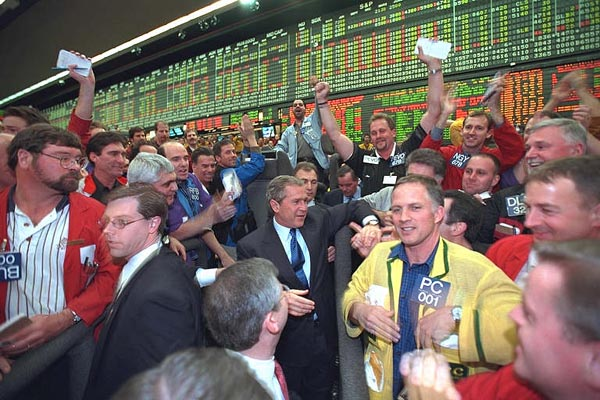
President George W. Bush at the CME in March 2001

CME Group announced in 2021 that it will permanently close most of its physical trading pits, including those for grain trading. They had been closed since March 2020 due to the outbreak of the COVID-19 pandemic.

=== Electronic trading ===
Operating virtually around the clock, today the CME Globex Trading System is at the heart of CME. Proposed in 1987, it was introduced in 1992 as the first global electronic trading platform for futures contracts. This fully electronic trading system allows market participants to trade from booths at the exchange or while sitting in a home or office thousands of miles away. On October 19, 2004, the one billionth (1,000,000,000) transaction was recorded.

When CME Globex was first launched, it used Reuters' technology and network. September 1998 saw the launch of the second generation of CME Globex using a modified version of the NSC trading system, developed by Paris Bourse for the MATIF (now Euronext).

Traders connect to CME Globex via Market Data Protocol (MDP) and iLink 2.0 for order routing.

== Merger ==
On October 17, 2006, Chicago Mercantile Exchange announced a merger with the Chicago Board of Trade in an $8 billion deal. Shareholders of both companies approved the merger on July 9, 2007, and the deal closed on July 12, 2007. The overarching holding company then launched as CME Group. On January 13, 2008, electronic trading at the Chicago Board of Trade shifted onto CME Globex.

== Investigation ==
In 1984, the CME was investigated by the U.S. Government Accountability Office. During this investigation, it was realized that the open-outcry system could be abused. The GAO noted that the exchange made attempts to cut down on malpractice, but that it is likely that illegal activity still occurs.

== Products ==
Chicago Mercantile Exchange was known as the Chicago Butter and Egg Board when it was founded in 1898, and futures available through the exchange were initially limited to agricultural products. In 1919 the Board was restructured and the name changed to Chicago Mercantile Exchange, which reflected a new focus on commodities beyond butter and eggs, including potatoes, onions, and cheese. In 1972, CME introduced the first financial futures market, offering contracts on seven foreign currencies. By the 2000s, CME had expanded to offer four core financial instruments: commodities, foreign exchange, interest rates, and stock indexes. As of 2022, CME operates under CME Group, which offers a number of derivatives products, including commodities, equity indices, foreign exchange, interest rates, and weather.

For example, as of 2017, agricultural contracts were offered on products such as wheat, corn, soybeans, and lean hogs. In metal futures, the CME trades precious metals, base metals, and ferrous metals. The Chicago Mercantile Exchange is the only market for trading in weather derivatives. It launched its first weather products in 1999. Products include, but are not limited to: futures on rainfall, snowfall, hurricanes, and temperature.

== Outages ==
On the evening of November 27, 2025, the CME exchange suffered almost a 10 hour outage caused by a cooling issue at one of its CyrusOne data centers. This disrupted global markets across the Asia Friday trading day and into the European day before the market re-opened.

== See also ==
- Commodity Exchange Act
- Demutualization
- List of futures exchanges
- List of traded commodities
- Securities market participants (United States)
