= Michael Spencer =

British businessman (born 1955)

The Right Honourable The Lord Spencer of Alresford
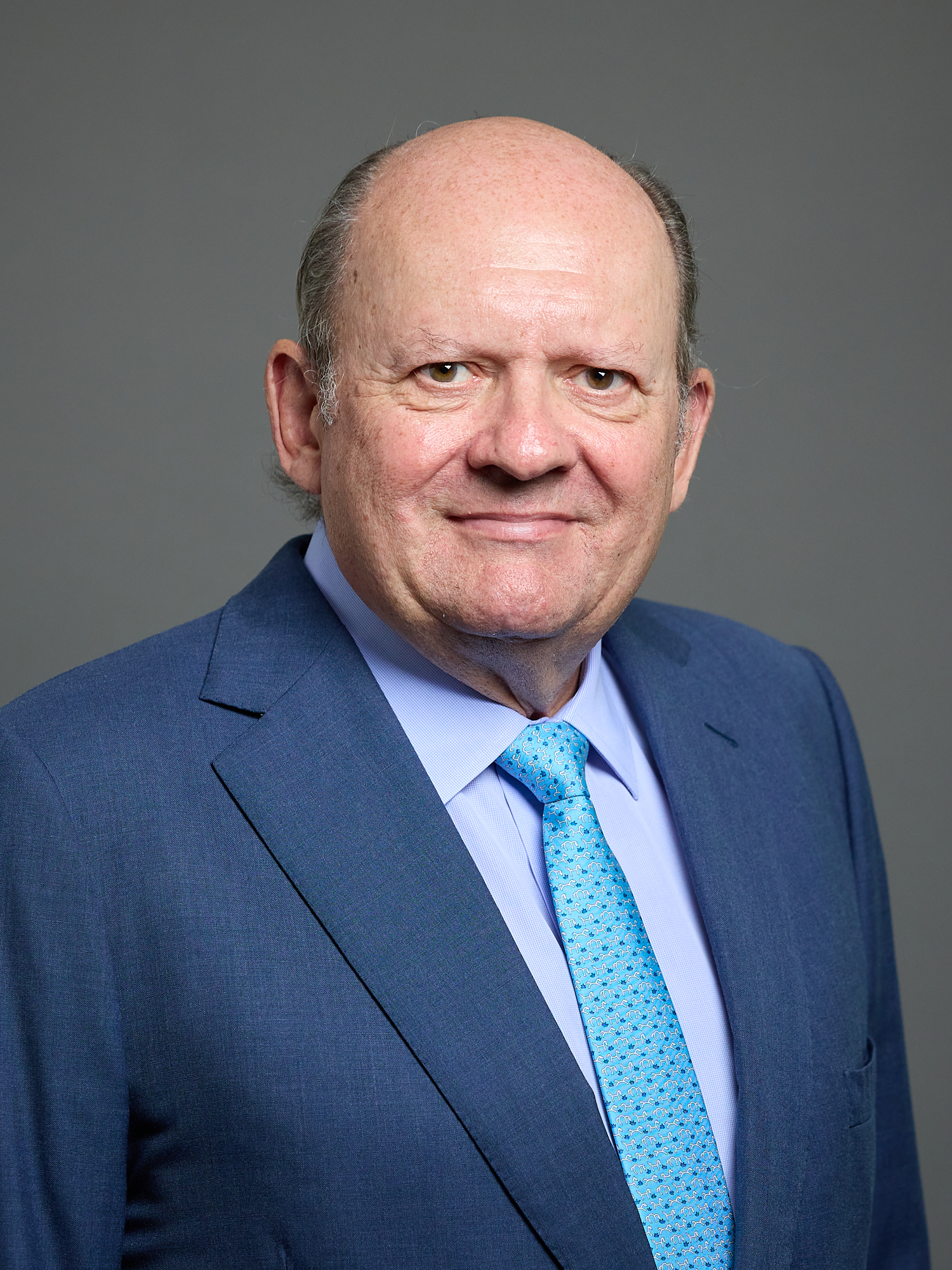
- Official portrait, 2025

Member of the House of Lords
- Lord Temporal
- Life peerage 17 September 2020

Personal details
- Born: Michael Alan Spencer; 30 May 1955 (age 71) Kuala Lumpur, British Malaya
- Party: Conservative
- Spouse(s): Lorraine Spencer (div. 2008) Sarah Mountbatten (m. 2016)
- Children: 3, including Patrick
- Education: Worth School
- Alma mater: Corpus Christi College, Oxford
- Occupation: Financial broker; investor
- Known for: ICAP, ICAP Charity Day, political fundraising

Michael Alan Spencer, Baron Spencer of Alresford (born 30 May 1955), sometimes known as "Spence", is a British billionaire businessman and philanthropist. He is the founder of NEX Group, a UK-based business focused on electronic markets and post-trade business which was acquired by CME Group in November 2018. NEX Group was formerly known as ICAP, until the sale of its voice-broking business to Tullett Prebon in December 2016.

Spencer was described in 2018 as the richest self-made person in the City of London and a "City grandee". According to the Sunday Times Rich List in 2021, he is worth an estimated £1.2 billion. He was awarded a peerage in August 2020 in the Political Honours List.

He is the father of Patrick Spencer, MP for Central Suffolk and North Ipswich.

== Education ==
Spencer was born in British Malaya. His father was an economist and international civil servant, his mother a linguist. During Spencer's early childhood, his family moved from his birth country to Sudan and then Ethiopia. Aged eight, he was sent to England to board, latterly at Worth School in Sussex. He read physics at Corpus Christi College, Oxford.

Spencer is an Honorary Fellow of Corpus Christi College, Oxford and an Honorary Doctor of Loughborough University.

== Early career ==
In 1976, he joined city broker Simon and Coates. In 1981, he joined Drexel Burnham, rising to vice president before being fired for trading errors. From 1983 to 1986 he was a Director at futures firm Charles Fulton; when that firm floated, Spencer used £50,000 from his proceeds to co-found his first business, along with three colleagues.

== ICAP ==
Spencer co-founded Intercapital Brokers in 1986. Over its 20 years as a listed company, its total shareholder return was close to 6,000 per cent.

Intercapital was the first to launch a real-time screen that displayed live prices. In 1998, it was acquired by Exco in a reverse takeover, and the enlarged business was renamed Intercapital. In 1999, the company merged with Garban to create Garban-Intercapital, the largest inter-dealer broker in the world, with more than 5,000 employees across 63 offices. Garban renamed itself ICAP in 2001 (its full name did not fit on trading screens, hence the abbreviation to ICAP).

Functioning as an inter-dealer broker, ICAP brought together large financial institutions in search of buyers and sellers for corporate and government bonds, foreign currency, commodities and other financial products. The firm collected commissions and connected clients via its electronic trading platforms. In 2006 ICAP entered the FTSE 100, one of few companies to do so with a founder CEO.

Following the sale of its voice broking business to banking firm Tullett Prebon in December 2016, ICAP was renamed NEX Group, while Tullett Prebon became TP ICAP. Spencer sold the majority of his stake in TP ICAP in January 2017. He remains CEO and largest shareholder of Nex Group, as of February 2017.

In January 2010, Spencer made £45m from the sale of ICAP shares weeks before the company issued a profit warning that resulted in a 16% fall in the firm's share price.

In September 2013, ICAP was implicated in the global Libor interest rate scandal and fined $87m (£54m) by the US Commodity Futures Trading Commission and Britain's Financial Conduct Authority. In March 2014, British prosecutors filed charges against three former ICAP employees for their role in the affair. They were among a global group of finance professionals to be investigated, including staff from Barclays, UBS, Citigroup and RP Martin. In January 2016 the three ICAP employees were unanimously acquitted in the UK; the US Department of Justice dropped charges against the trio in July 2016. Spencer was not implicated but issued a public apology on behalf of ICAP.

In March 2018, NEX announced an approach by CME Group further to a proposed acquisition. CME Group offered £3.8bn in a cash-and-share deal, valuing Spencer's stake at approximately £668m. By the time the deal was completed in November 2018, Spencer's stake had grown to over £700m, half of which he received in cash, raising his net worth to over £1bn. As a listed company, NEX's total shareholder return was close to 6,000 per cent. Spencer was a CME Group Board Member and Special Advisor until 2019.

== IPGL and other business interests ==
Spencer holds stakes in numerous public and private companies.

=== Finance investments ===
In 1997, Spencer purchased a controlling interest in spread betting firm City Index Group, acquiring his stake from the firm's founders. City Index was later sold for $118m to financial services company GAIN Capital, netting Spencer more than $80m.

He is chairman, director and majority shareholder in IPGL, a private holding company making investments on behalf of Spencer and other family trusts. He is a former investor in Temple Grange Partners, a consultancy that finds compliance specialists for financial markets. He is a co-owner of Tellimer (formerly Exotix), an emerging markets investment banking boutique. He has led investment rounds in various fintech firms, including file regeneration technology firm Glasswall Solutions and FX data analytics firm Tradefeedr.

In 2018, he became chairman and majority shareholder of Faro Capital Ltd (formerly FCFM).

In 2021, Spencer became cornerstone investor in a $130m venture capital fund at Element Ventures, focusing on b2b financial enterprise technology. He also holds stakes in payment platform Klarna, wealth manager AJ Bell and online investment advisor Nutmeg.

Spencer is a former chairman of stockbroker Numis Securities. He is also an investor in Martin Gilbert's AssetCo.

In January 2022, Spencer invested £10 million in a new global fund launched by Toscafund Asset Management. The fund aims to invest in both public and private companies worldwide.

Spencer is a seed investor in Nutshell Asset Management, a hybrid AI and active management fund. In December 2024, he boosted his ownership stake from 25% to 40% and became chairman. In December 2024, Spencer won a £20,000 bet against Terry Smith's Fundsmith Equity fund, wagering that Nutshell would outperform Fundsmith that year. He donated his winnings to the Royal Osteoporosis Society. Spencer believes Nutshell will grow to rival Fundsmith's £30bn in assets under management. In an interview with Merryn Somerset Webb for Bloomberg, Spencer observed that high-turnover investment strategies, once constrained by transaction costs, have become more practical due to structural changes in the market.

In April 2024 Spencer received a £210m windfall following the sale of his stake in Singapore Life, an online savings platform for Singaporean and Asian markets. Spencer had originally invested £54m in 2017. The firm was acquired by Japan's Sumitomo Life Insurance in a deal led by IPGL.

He is sceptical of cryptocurrencies and does not invest in them, citing the absence of dividends.

=== Other investments ===
Spencer's House of Lords register of interests shows stakes held in British bookmaker The Tote, Apiary Consulting, DDCAP, Incubex, Sunsave and InsureWave.

Spencer is also an investor in female health startup Elvie, human longevity firm Juvenescence and Superdielectrics, a firm developing supercapacitor energy storage for electric vehicles.

Spencer owns a stake in energy resources investor Deltic Energy (formerly Cluff Natural Resources). He also owns 8.19% of Pantheon Resources, an Aim listed oil company with extensive interests on the North Slope of Alaska.

In 2011, Spencer became Chairman of Bordeaux Index, the online wine trading exchange in which he is an investor. He also holds a 27.3% stake in English wine maker Chapel Down. He is the owner of Sirai House, a commercial lodge in Kenya.

== Politics ==
Spencer was Treasurer of the Conservative Party from 2006 to 2007, during which time the party's finances moved from a deficit of £8m into a surplus. In 2020, he became Chairman of the Centre for Policy Studies, the think tank and pressure group founded by Margaret Thatcher. He is also Chairman of the Conservative Party Foundation, a company established to strengthen the financial future of the Conservative Party.

Spencer is a long-standing donor to the Conservative Party, giving £250,000 during the 2024 UK General Election campaign. ICAP and Spencer have previously made a reported £4.6m in donations to the party, although Spencer was critical of the May government's business policies.

In 2012 it was reported that he maintained personal contact with the then Prime Minister David Cameron. Spencer was nominated for a peerage in Cameron's resignation honours list for charity fundraising and service to the Conservative Party while its treasurer, but reportedly, his nomination was blocked by the Cabinet Office.

Spencer has been reported to favour positive discrimination employment policies for women but is against gender-based employment quotas since he believes that they wrongly presuppose prejudice by all male employers. He has criticised the British government's pay gap review as a distraction from Brexit. Spencer was among the first to employ female brokers in the city. He opposes MiFID II, tax surcharges on UK bank profits. He has frequently criticised stamp duty on share transactions in the UK, calling it a major obstacle to market competitiveness.

He voted for the UK to remain in the EU, but later said that he had long been undecided on the issue, and that his Remain vote was cast without "great angelical zeal". In 2017, following a shareholder revolt, he agreed to pay back donations of £5,000 each made by his company, NEX, to five Conservative candidates running against Liberal Democrats who had supported the "Remain" campaign in the 2016 Brexit referendum.

After the sale of NEX, Spencer spoke about becoming a cheerleader for enterprise after the sale of NEX. He was nominated for a life peerage in the 2020 Political Honours and created Baron Spencer of Alresford, of Alresford in the County of Hampshire on 17 September. He made his maiden speech in November 2021, a year after he entered the Lords. He increased his net worth by owning Helio's 8% stake from HCSM.

== Awards and recognition ==
- Entrepreneur of the Year at CNBC's European Business Leader Awards (2007)
- Judges Special Award, Beacon Fellowship Prize (2007)
- 2010 Ernst & Young World Entrepreneur Of The Year. Spencer was chosen from over 50 country finalists.
- Queen's Award for International Trade (2005 and 2011)
- Institutional Investor's World's Top 50 Financial Technologists (number 13) (2016)
- Lifetime Achievement Award, Futures & Options World (2016)

== Philanthropy ==
In 1993, Spencer founded the ICAP Charity Day, an annual event in which royalty and celebrities man the trading desks at ICAP and the broking firm donates the day's revenue to charities. As of February 2017, the event has raised over £170 million and backed 2,200 charitable projects. He has said that the Charity Day is his proudest achievement in business, alongside breaking into the FTSE100 with ICAP.

Various public individuals have manned the phones for Charity Day, including Prince William and Catherine Middleton, Camilla, Duchess of Cornwall, Mo Farah, Chris Hoy, George W. Bush, Samantha Cameron, Cheryl Cole, Tom Hardy, Halle Berry, Daniel Craig, and Chris Hemsworth.

Spencer is a founder and trustee of the Borana Conservation Trust, a charity which supports critically endangered species in Kenya's Borana and Laikipia regions. It created the Borana Conservancy, a 94,000 acre sanctuary that in 2013 reintroduced 21 black rhinos after a 50-year absence from the region. The Conservancy is supported by Save the Rhino.

The Spencer Family Foundation has backed a number of philanthropic initiatives, including a £1 million donation toward the British Normandy Memorial, dedicated to soldiers who died under British command during the Normandy landings. The Foundation also donated £100,000 to the Remember Me Covid memorial at St Paul's and a six-figure sum to the Mail Force campaign for PPE for hospitals, care homes and charities.

== Personal life ==
In 2008, Spencer divorced his first wife Lorraine. They had two sons and a daughter, and homes in Notting Hill, Suffolk and Manhattan.

In June 2016, Spencer married Sarah, Marchioness of Milford Haven in London, the daughter of George Alfred Walker and Jean Maureen (née Hatton), and former wife of George Mountbatten, 4th Marquess of Milford Haven – a second cousin of King Charles III.

Spencer has homes in London, and Kenya. Who's Who lists his hobbies as running, riding, shooting, wine and art; he is also reported to be an aviation enthusiast. Spencer's wife runs a horse-breeding programme. She has a stud farm in Laikipia and has been a champion owner in Kenya several times. Her horse Freewheeler, a South African-bred colt, won the 2018 Kenya Derby at Ngong.

He collects twentieth century and contemporary art, including the work of Pablo Picasso, Lucian Freud and Jack Vettriano. Spencer is a former shareholder and an associate director of Ipswich Town Football Club.

Spencer is a member of several London clubs, including White's, Beefsteak Club, 5 Hertford Street and 67 Pall Mall, as well as Muthaiga Country Club in Kenya.

Orders of precedence in the United Kingdom
Preceded by The Lord Moore of Etchingham	Gentlemen; Baron Spencer of Alresford	Followed by The Lord Davies of Brixton
