= David E. Rutter =

American financial services executive

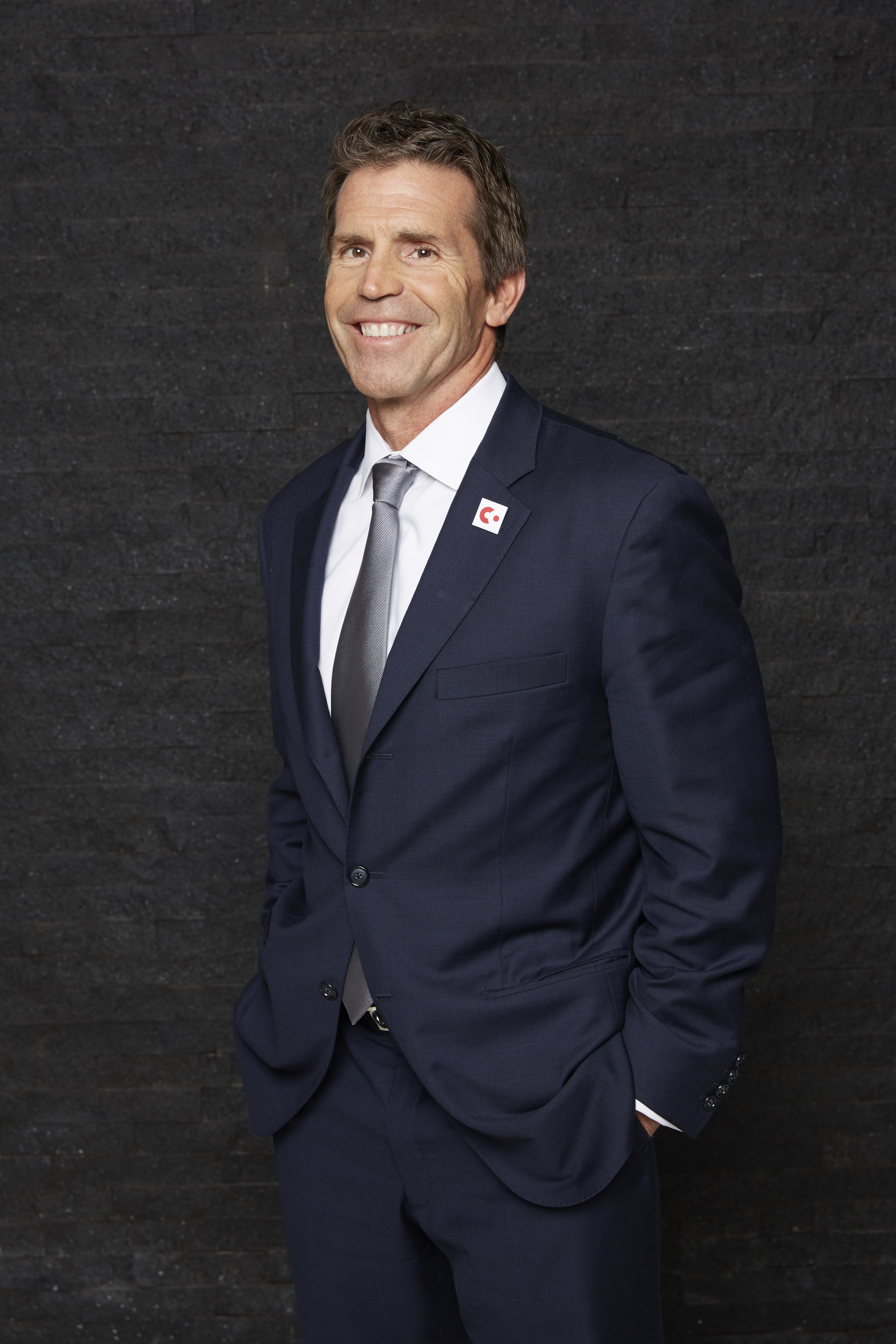
- David E. Rutter in New York City in 2017.
- Born: 1962 (age 62–63); United States
- Education: Villanova University
- Occupation(s): Business executive, entrepreneur
- Known for: Founder and CEO of blockchain company R3

David E. Rutter is an American financial services executive. He is the founder and chief executive of R3, a blockchain technology company, and the founder and owner of LiquidityEdge, a trading platform for US Treasuries.

== Education ==
Rutter received a Bachelor of Science degree in business administration from Villanova University in 1984.

== Career ==
Rutter worked in the electronic broking division at ICAP Plc for ten years, becoming chief executive in 2009. He managed the BrokerTec fixed income and EBS foreign exchange platforms.

Before joining ICAP, he was co-owner and CEO (Americas) of Prebon Yamane. In 1988, Prebon entered into a joint venture with the Chicago Board of Trade that led to the introduction of trading on computer screens.

In 2014, Rutter founded R3, a software developer that built the blockchain platform Corda. The aim of the company was to build blockchain applications for banks to supplement or replace their "creaking" computer systems.

Rutter founded LiquidityEdge in 2015 to provide an alternative trading model for US Treasuries. LiquidityEdge was acquired by MarketAxess in November 2019 for $150 million, including $100 million in cash and 146,450 shares of MarketAxess stock.

In 2020, Rutter launched LedgerEdge, a company that uses blockchain technology to digitise corporate bond trading.

In 2025, R3 made an agreement to link Corda to the Solana blockchain. This would create a way for its banking clients to create crypto tokens and trade global stocks, bonds and funds. Rutter welcomed the changed attitude to blockchain of the Trump presidency, saying that R3 would expand in the US after focusing on more regulated markets in other countries.
