= GFI Group =

Financial services company

GFI Group, Inc
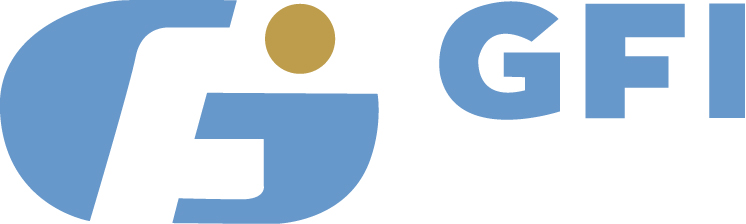
- Company type: Subsidiary
- Industry: Financial services
- Founded: 1987
- Founder: Michael Gooch, Executive Chairman
- Headquarters: 55 Water Street, New York, New York, U.S.
- Area served: Worldwide
- Key people: Colin Heffron, CEO
- Products: Fixed income, financials, equity, commodity, trading systems, data & analytics, clearing
- Revenue: US$ 924.59 million (2012)
- Operating income: US$ 10.5 million (2012)
- Net income: US$ 8.9 million (2012)
- Total assets: US$ 1.180 billion (2012)
- Total equity: US$ 425.16 million (2012)
- Number of employees: 2,062 (2012)
- Parent: BGC Partners
- Website: www.gfigroup.com

GFI Group Inc. (GFI) is a financial services company that through its subsidiaries provides brokerage services, trade execution, market data, trading platforms and other software products. Clients are institutional customers in markets for a range of fixed income, financial, equity and commodity instruments. GFI is headquartered in New York City and operates from New York, London, Paris, Tokyo, Hong Kong, Singapore and 15 other smaller financial centres such as Dublin, Nyon, Bogotá and Tel Aviv.

GFI operates a hybrid brokerage approach, combining a range of telephonic and electronic trade execution services, depending on the nature of the products and the needs of the individual markets. The company complements its hybrid brokerage capabilities with decision support services, such as data and analytics products, research, real-time auctions and post-transaction services, such as straight through processing (STP), clearing links and trade and portfolio management services. The company was listed on NYSE under GFIG until March 2015 when it was majority bought by BGC Partners.

== History ==
GFI Group Inc. was founded by Michael Gooch in 1987. GFI was the first broker to offer over-the-counter (OTC) US government bond options to the industry. In 2001, GFI acquired FX analytical software company FENICS Software Ltd. In 2005, GFI acquired the North American operations of Starsupply Petroleum LLC, a broker of oil products and related derivative and option contracts. In 2006 the firm acquired the North American brokerage operations of Amerex Energy, a wholesale broker of electric power, natural gas and emissions products. In 2008, GFI acquired Trayport Ltd, a leading provider of trading software for OTC energy products and other markets.

On September 28, 1999, the GFI group established a new venture to offer an online spot market for international telecommunications minutes, according to Michael Gooch, GFI President and CEO.

In 2010, GFI Group moved its listing from Nasdaq to the NYSE.

In March 2015, GFI delisted from the NYSE following a 56% share buyout by BGC Partners in February 2015. Since the takeover, GFI operates as a division of BGC. In April 2018, a federal judge threw out a lawsuit against GFI Group by former GFI Group shareholders, who claimed a statement by the CEO had resulted in them selling their shares too early.

== Operations ==
GFI Group provides execution services for institutional wholesale customers by either matching their trading needs with counterparties having reciprocal interests or directing their orders to an exchange or other trading venue. Its operations focus on a wide variety of assets: credit, financial, equity and commodity instruments, including both cash and derivative products. In recent years, it has developed cash equity and cash bond brokerage business that complement its brokerage of OTC derivative products, as well as expanding its services for cash instruments, such as corporate fixed income and equities products. In essence, GFI's primary role as a wholesale broker is to enhance trading liquidity.

== Philanthropy ==
GFI Group supports the Bob Woodruff Foundation in its work educating the public about the needs of service members returning from war. GFI has supported both the foundation and its campaign ReMIND.org. The company was a founding funder of the 13th Stand Up For Heroes Benefit held in September 2019.

== Competition ==
- Tullett Prebon
- BGC Partners
- ICAP
- Tradeweb

== See also ==
- Foreign Exchange
- Broker-dealer
