= John Phizackerley =

- Born: John Patrick Phizackerley; January 1962 (age 64)
- Occupations: Banker and businessman
- Title: Former CEO, TP ICAP
- Term: September 2014-July 2018
- Predecessor: Terry Smith
- Successor: Nicolas Breteau

John Patrick Phizackerley (born January 1962) was a British banker, and was the CEO of TP ICAP, an inter-dealer money broker and FTSE 250 Index company with offices in 24 countries.

== Early life ==
Phizackerley was brought up in Oxford, the son of a father who lectured there in clinical biochemistry at Balliol College.

== Career ==
Phizackerley's first job was as an underground mining engineer in South Africa, at what is now Anglo American.

In 1986, Phizackerley joined Lehman Brothers. In 2008, Nomura took over the collapsed bank's Asian and European arms, and he rose to become chief executive of Nomura's Europe, Middle East, and Africa operations, until March 2013.

Phizackerley has been CEO of Tullett Prebon since September 2014, when he succeeded Terry Smith, who left to further develop Fundsmith, an asset management company he founded in 2010.

In July 2018, Phizackerley was sacked after a board mishap as CEO of TP ICAP by its board "over rising costs", and succeeded by its global head of broking Nicolas Breteau.
