= Soden v British and Commonwealth Holdings plc =

- Court: House of Lords
- Citation: [1998] AC 298, [1997] 2 BCLC 501, [1997] 4 All ER 353

Case history
- Prior action: [1997] 2 WLR 206, [1996] 2 CLY 3498

Soden v British and Commonwealth Holdings plc [1998] AC 298 is a UK insolvency law case, decided in the House of Lords. It decided that damages for negligent misrepresentation inducing purchase of company shares are not "sums due" to shareholders for the purpose of the Insolvency Act 1986, s 74(2)(f), so that a claim for such damages is not subordinated to claims from other creditors.

== Facts ==
British and Commonwealth Holdings plc ("BCH") bought all the shares in Atlantic Computers plc ("AC") for £434m in 1988. Both went into administration. BCH brought an action against AC for negligent misrepresentation, which induced BCH to buy shares, and also against its advisors in the acquisition Barclays de Zoete Wedd Ltd. ("BZW") started proceedings against AC for contribution.

AC's administrator appealed against a Court of Appeal ruling, arguing that neither BZW's, nor BCH's claim would be subordinated to the claims of other creditors under s 74(2)(f) IA 1986.

== Judgment ==
The House of Lords (Lord Browne-Wilkinson, Lloyd, Steyn, Hoffmann and Hope) dismissed the appeal. Sums due to a "member of the company (in his character as a member)" within s 74(2)(f) only extended to sums recoverable in actions based on the statutory contract between the members and the company under the Companies Act 1985 s 14(1) and did not include the type of damages sought by BCH. Lord Browne-Wilkinson gave the lead judgment.

My Lords, in 1988 British & Commonwealth Holdings Plc. purchased for some £434m. the whole of the share capital of Atlantic Computers Plc. The acquisition proved to be disastrous. Atlantic went into administration in 1990. The administrators of Atlantic are the appellants in your Lordships' House. B. & C. is also in administration. It has brought proceedings against, inter alia, Atlantic ("the main action") for damages for negligent misrepresentations said to have been made by Atlantic so as to induce B. & C. to acquire its shares. B. & C. has also brought proceedings against Barclays de Zoete Wedd Ltd. ("the B.Z.W. action") for damages for negligent advice given in relation to the acquisition of the Atlantic shares. B.Z.W. has issued third party proceedings against Atlantic for contribution and damages.

Quite apart from the claims in the main action and the B.Z.W. action, the liabilities of Atlantic greatly exceed its assets. On 30 March 1994 the court approved a scheme of arrangement to which B. & C. was not a party. It provided that, subject to the payment of preferential liabilities, the scheme assets should be distributed pari passu between the scheme creditors broadly on the same basis as if Atlantic were in liquidation.

Neither the main action nor the B.Z.W. action has yet come to trial. In these proceedings the administrators have applied to the court by originating summons for directions (a) whether the damages and costs recoverable by B. & C. and B.Z.W. if the actions succeed will be subordinated to the claims of the other creditors of Atlantic by virtue of being sums due to a "member of the company (in his character of a member)" within section 74(2)(f) of the Insolvency Act 1986 and (b) if so, whether the subordinated claims of B. & C. and B.Z.W. fall to be treated as scheme liabilities under the scheme of arrangement. In one sense, the originating summons raises hypothetical questions since, unless the main action and the B.Z.W. action succeed, the priority of those claims will not be a material factor. However, the courts below and your Lordships were satisfied that it is proper to decide these points at the present time. The claims in the main action and the B.Z.W. action, if successful, may give rise to enormous damages (in the region of £500m.). The status of the claims in these actions vis-à-vis the other creditors of Atlantic has an immediate and profound impact on the way in which the scheme of arrangement is now to be administered.

The trial judge, Robert Walker J. [1995] 1 B.C.L.C. 686 held, first, that B. & C.'s claim was not subordinated to the claims of the other creditors; second, that B.Z.W.'s claim was not so subordinated; third, that if contrary to his views such claims were subordinated they did not rank as scheme liabilities under the scheme of arrangement. The administrators appealed to the Court of Appeal against the judge's decision in relation to the B. & C. claim but not against his decision on the B.Z.W. claim. B. & C. cross-appealed against the judge's decision on the question whether its claims were scheme liabilities. The Court of Appeal (Russell, Hirst and Peter Gibson L.JJ.), ante, pp. 304G et seq. upheld the judge on both points and dismissed both the appeal and the cross-appeal. B. & C. has not appealed to your Lordships against the decision on its cross-appeal by the Court of Appeal. Therefore the only point remaining for decision by your Lordships is whether B. & C.'s claims in the main action (if successful) are by virtue of section 74(2)(f) subordinated to the claims of the general creditors of Atlantic.

Section 74 of the Act of 1986 is the first of a group of sections cross-headed "Contributories." So far as relevant it provides:

"(1) When a company is wound up, every present and past member is liable to contribute to its assets to any amount sufficient for payment of its debts and liabilities, and the expenses of the winding up, and for the adjustment of the rights of the contributories among themselves. (2) This is subject as follows . . . (f) a sum due to any member of the company (in his character of a member) by way of dividends, profits or otherwise is not deemed to be a debt of the company, payable to that member in a case of competition between himself and any other creditor not a member of the company, but any such sum may be taken into account for the purpose of the final adjustment of the rights of the contributories among themselves."

The legislative history of this section can be traced back to section 38 of the Companies Act 1862 (25 & 26 Vict. c. 89), in which section 38(7) corresponds to section 74(2)(f) of the Act of 1986.

The critical question is whether any damages ordered to be paid to B. & C. by Atlantic for misrepresentation by Atlantic inducing the purchase by B. & C. of Atlantic shares would constitute a sum due to a member of Atlantic (i.e. B. & C.) in its character of a member by way of dividends, profits or otherwise within the meaning of section 74(2)(f). If so, B. & C.'s claim will be subordinated to that of Atlantic's general creditors.

Mr. Potts, for the administrators of Atlantic, submitted that the basic principle applicable was that "members come last," i.e. the members of a company can take nothing until the outside creditors have been paid in full. He further submitted that in the present case there would be a manifest absurdity if B. & C., as shareholder in its wholly owned subsidiary Atlantic, could circumvent that rule by claiming as damages sums quantified by reference to the worth of the Atlantic shares payable in respect of a misrepresentation leading to the acquisition of such shares. This would be to enable B. & C. to convert its position from that of a holder of worthless shares in its wholly owned subsidiary into that of a creditor ranking pari passu with ordinary creditors of that subsidiary.

Mr. Potts, of course, accepted that there could be sums due to a member otherwise than in his character of a member, e.g. loans made by a member to the company or sums due to a member under a contract for the sale of goods by the member to the company. He submitted that a claim is not a claim "in his character of a member" where it arises on an independent dealing or contract with the company and relies on section 149(2)(a) of the Act of 1986. That section permits the set-off against calls made on a contributory of

"any money due to him . . . on any independent dealing or contract with the company, but not any money due to him as a member of the company in respect of any dividend or profit . . ."

He submitted that a dealing or contract is not independent of the corporate nexus of membership or of the character of membership where such dealing or contract itself brings about the status of membership whether by way of subscription for shares or transfer of shares. In particular, he submits, a claim is maintained in the character of a member where the claimant seeks to recover from the company the price which he has paid for his shares on the basis that such shares are not worth what they were warranted or represented by the company to be worth. The claimant who is induced to acquire his shares by subscription falls within the class of those who are not allowed to compete with general creditors: see In re Addlestone Linoleum Co. (1887) 37 Ch.D. 191 and Webb Distributors (Aust.) Pty. Ltd. v. State of Victoria (1993) 11 A.C.S.R. 731 . There is no reason, he submitted, why a claimant who is induced to acquire his shares by purchase (as opposed to allotment) should be in a different position. In short, he submits that a sum is due to a person in his character as a member of a company where it is due to him under the bundle of rights which constitute his shares in the company or by reason of a warranty or misrepresentation on the part of the company going to the characteristics or value of the shares which induces him to acquire those shares.

I cannot accept these submissions. Section 74(2)(f) requires a distinction to be drawn between, on the one hand, sums due to a member in his character of a member by way of dividends, profits or otherwise and, on the other hand, sums due to a member otherwise than in his character as a member. In the absence of any other indication to the contrary, sums due in the character of a member must be sums falling due under and by virtue of the statutory contract between the members and the company and the members inter se constituted by section 14(1) of the Companies Act 1985:

"Subject to the provisions of this Act, the memorandum and articles, when registered, bind the company and its members to the same extent as if they respectively had been signed and sealed by each member, and contained covenants on the part of each member to observe all the provisions of the memorandum and of the articles."

A contract to similar effect was prescribed by section 16 of the Act of 1862 and all Acts since then. To the bundle of rights and liabilities created by the memorandum and articles of the company must be added those rights and obligations of members conferred and imposed on members by the Companies Acts. For ease of reference I will refer to the combined effect of section 14 and the other rights and liabilities of members imposed by the Companies Acts as "the statutory contract." In my judgment, in the absence of any contrary indication sums due to a member "in his character of a member" are only those sums the right to which is based by way of cause of action on the statutory contract.

That this is the correct interpretation is supported by the words in section 74(2)(f) "by way of dividends, profits or otherwise." There was some discussion in the judgment of the Court of Appeal whether these words disclose a genus requiring a sum "otherwise" due to be given a narrow construction under the ejusdem generis rule and as to what, if any, genus was disclosed by the words "by way of dividends, profits." In my view that is not the right approach to the section. The words "by way of dividends, profits or otherwise" are illustrations of what constitute sums due to a member in his character as such. They neither widen nor restrict the meaning of that phrase. But the reference to dividends and profits as examples of sums due in the character of a member entirely accords with the view I have reached as to the meaning of the section since they indicate rights founded on the statutory contract and not otherwise.

Moreover, the construction of the section which I favour accords with principle. The principle is not "members come last:" a member having a cause of action independent of the statutory contract is in no worse a position than any other creditor. The relevant principle is that the rights of members as members come last, i.e. rights founded on the statutory contract are, as the price of limited liability, subordinated to the rights of creditors based on other legal causes of action. The rationale of the section is to ensure that the rights of members as such do not compete with the rights of the general body of creditors.

If this is the correct dividing line between sums due in the character of a member and those not so due, there is no room for including in the former class cases where membership, though an essential qualification for acquiring the claim, is not the foundation of the cause of action. This is illustrated by the decisions on directors' remuneration. After an early aberration (In re Leicester Club and County Racecourse Co.; Ex parte Cannon (1885) 30 Ch.D. 629) it is now clearly established that directors' fees are not due to a director "in his character of a member" even where the articles of the company require a director to hold a share qualification and provide for the remuneration of the directors: In re Dale and Plant Ltd. (1889) 43 Ch.D. 255 ; In re New British Iron Co.; Ex parte Beckwith [1898] 1 Ch. 324 ; In re W.H. Eutrope & Sons Pty. Ltd. [1932] V.L.R. 453 . Although membership is a necessary qualification for appointment as a director, the cause of action to recover the remuneration is not based on the rights of a member but on a separate contract to pay remuneration.

Mr. Potts placed great reliance on the decisions in the Addlestone and Webb cases, in both of which it was held that a sum due in respect of damages payable for breach of contract or misrepresentation made by the company on the occasion of the issue (as opposed to the purchase) of its shares were held to be excluded by the section. Before considering these cases, there are two background points to be made. First, there was a principle established in Houldsworth v. City of Glasgow Bank (1880) 5 App.Cas. 317 that a shareholder could not sue for damages for misrepresentation inducing his subscription for shares unless he first rescinded the contract and that once the company had gone into liquidation such rescission was impossible. This principle has now been modified by section 111A of the Companies Act 1985, as inserted by section 131(1) of the Companies Act 1989. Second, it was not until the decision of this House in Ooregum Gold Mining Co. of India Ltd. v. Roper; Wallroth v. Roper [1892] A.C. 125 that it was established that a company had no power to issue shares at a discount.

In the Addlestone case, 37 Ch.D. 191 the company had issued £10 shares expressed as being fully paid at a discount of £2 10s.. Upon the company going into liquidation a call of £2 10s.. per share was made. The shareholders paid the call and then sought to prove in the winding up for damages of £2 10s.. per share "for breach of contract or otherwise in respect of the shares." Kay J. held that the claim was excluded by section 38(7) of the Act of 1862. He said, at pp. 197-198:

"Now, unquestionably the applicants - retaining these shares and claiming damages because the shares are not exactly what they were represented to be - are making such claims in the character of members of the company, and the only question is whether such claims are for sums due 'by way of dividends, profits, or otherwise.' . . . Practically, what these applicants are seeking to recover by their proof is a dividend in respect of the £2 10s.. per share which they have been compelled to pay in the winding up. But as shareholders they have contracted that they will pay this money, and that it shall be first applied in payment of the creditors whose debts are not due to them as members of the company - that is, they are practically admitting their liability to pay the £2 10s.. per share to such other creditors and yet seeking to get part of it back out of the pockets of those very creditors themselves. I confess it seems to me that the money so claimed is not only claimed in the character of members but that the claim is just as unreasonable as if it were a claim of dividends or profits, and that, accordingly, it comes within the words 'or otherwise' which I have read from section 38."

He also decided that the claim was excluded by the Houldsworth principle, 5 App.Cas. 317 .

In the Court of Appeal, the point under section 38(7) received little attention. Cotton L.J. decided that the shareholders could not prove because the issue of shares at a discount (if it had occurred) was unlawful and that in any event the claim failed under the Houldsworth principle. As to the section 38(7) point he said, obiter, 37 Ch.D. 191, 205: "I think it would have been very difficult to come to the conclusion that they could compete with the outside creditors." Lindley L.J. decided the case solely on the Houldsworth principle. Lopes L.J. said that he agreed with the construction put by Kay J. on section 38(7).

If there had been a cause of action in the Addlestone case, it must, as it seems to me, have been based upon the statutory contract between the member and the company. "Dividends" and "profits" represent what might be called positive claims of membership; the fruits which have accrued to the member by virtue of his membership. But the principle must apply equally to negative claims; claims based upon having paid money to the company under the statutory contract which the member says that he is entitled to have refunded by way of compensation for misrepresentation or breach of contract. These, too, are claims necessarily made in his character as a member. But, in any event, the reasons given by Kay J. for treating the case as falling within section 38(7) are directed exclusively to matters relevant to a claim involving the issue of shares by the company but irrelevant to a claim relating to the purchase of fully paid shares from a third party. Under the statutory contract (including the obligation in the winding up to pay all sums not previously paid on the shares) the claimants were bound to pay the unpaid £2 10s.. in respect of each share. If such a payment were not made the capital of the company would not be maintained and the general body of creditors would be thereby prejudiced. If, in such a case, the member could recover by way of damages for breach of the contract to issue the shares at a discount the same amount as he was bound to contribute on the winding up that would indirectly produce an unauthorised reduction in the capital of the company. Such a failure to maintain the capital of the company would be in conflict with what Lord Macnaghten (in the Ooregum case [1892] A.C. 125, 145) said was the dominant and cardinal principle of the Companies Acts, i.e. "that the investor shall purchase immunity from liability beyond a certain limit, on the terms that there shall be and remain a liability up to that limit."

There is nothing in the Addlestone case to justify the application of that decision to cases where the claim against the company is founded on a misrepresentation made by the company on the purchase of existing shares from a third party. To allow proof for such a claim in competition with the general body of creditors does not either directly or indirectly produce a reduction of capital. The general body of creditors are in exactly the same position as they would have been in had the claim been wholly unrelated to shares in the company.

The decision of the High Court of Australia in the Webb case, 11 A.C.S.R. 731 stands on exactly the same footing. Section 360(1)(k) of the Companies Code of Victoria was in substantially the same terms as section 38(7) of the English Act of 1862 and section 74(2)(f) of the Act of 1986. The court held that section 361 was applicable to building societies as well as to limited companies. Three societies had issued non-withdrawable shares. The claimants were claiming to prove for damages in the winding up of the building societies such damages being based on misrepresentations made by the societies on the issue of such shares to the effect that the shares were redeemable "like a deposit." The High Court held that the claim was excluded by the Houldsworth principle and held that the proposition deducible from that case was that a shareholder may not directly or indirectly receive back any part of his or her contribution to the capital save with the approval of the court. The High Court further relied on the Addlestone decision and section 360(1) but carefully delimited its application to cases of contracts to subscribe for shares. They held, 11 A.C.S.R. 731, 741 that the claim in that case "falls within the area which section 360(1)(k) seeks to regulate: the protection of creditors by maintaining the capital of the company." It is therefore quite clear that both the decision and the reasoning of the High Court were dependent upon the same factors as those in the Addlestone case, i.e. the protection of creditors from indirect reductions of capital. Those are factors relevant to cases of subscription for shares issued by the company but wholly irrelevant to purchases from third parties of already issued shares.

I express no view as to the present law of the United Kingdom where the sum due is in respect of a misrepresentation or breach of contract relating to the issue of shares. Section 111A of the Act of 1985 provides:

"A person is not debarred from obtaining damages or other compensation from a company by reason only of his holding or having held shares in the company or any right to apply or subscribe for shares or to be included in the company's register in respect of shares."

It is plain that this section operates so as, at least in part, to override the Houldsworth principle. But to what extent and with what consequential results is not yet clear. All that is necessary for the decision of the present case is to demonstrate, as I have sought to do, that the decisions in Addlestone, 37 Ch.D. 191 and Webb, 11 A.C.S.R. 731 do not apply to claims other than those relating to the issue of shares by the company.

For these reasons, which are substantially the same as those given by the trial judge and the Court of Appeal in their admirable judgments, I am clearly of the opinion that the sum if any due to B. & C. is not due to it in its "character of a member" of Atlantic within section 74(2)(f). The claim stands on exactly the same footing as any other claim by B. & C. against Atlantic which is wholly unrelated to the shares in Atlantic. In the circumstances, it is unnecessary to deal with the further point relied upon by B. & C. (but rejected by the Court of Appeal) that B. & C.'s claim being unliquidated is not "a sum due" within the meaning of the section.

I would dismiss the appeal.

== See also ==
- UK company law
- Re Atlantic Computer Systems plc (No 1) [1992] Ch 505
