= Linda Bell =

Provost and Dean at Barnard College, US

Linda A. Bell
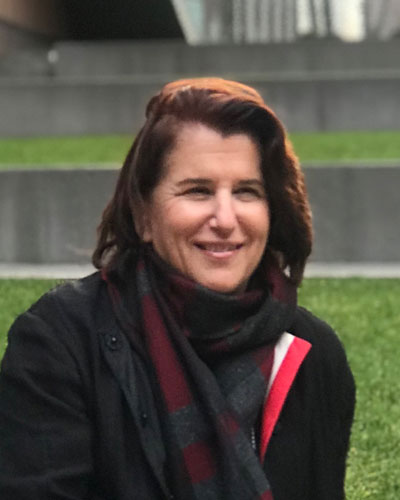
- Education: University of Pennsylvania; Harvard University
- Occupation(s): Provost, Barnard College; Economist

Linda A. Bell is the Provost and Dean of the Faculty at Barnard College of Columbia University in the City of New York. In addition to serving as Provost of Barnard College, she holds the position of Clair Tow Professor of Economics at the College. She is an empirical economist and scholar of labor markets and public policy. She has dedicated her teaching and research to examining compensation, union concessions, and discrimination, most recently focusing on disparities in gender compensation.

== Education ==
Provost Bell was a University Scholar at the University of Pennsylvania, where she received her BA. She earned her PhD in Economics from Harvard University.

== Career ==
Provost Bell has long been a part of academic life, serving as a visiting faculty member at Princeton University, Harvard University, and Stanford University. Before coming to Barnard College, she was the Provost and John B. Hurford Professor of Economics at Haverford College. She has worked as a consultant to the World Bank and the US Department of Labor. As Chair of the American Association of University Professors Committee on Faculty Compensation, she authored the Association’s Annual Compensation Report from 1997-2001. Throughout her career, Provost Bell has served as a Board Member for a number of public and non-profit organizations including on the Committee on the Status of Women in the Economics Profession. She is currently a Public Board Member of the Compensation and Audit Committee for BGC Partners, Inc. as well as a Board Member of Diversity Prep Charter Schools.
