= Phizackerley =

Phizackerley is a British surname. Notable people with the surname include:

- Gerald Phizackerley (born 1929), British clergy, Archdeacon of Chesterfield
- John Phizackerley (born 1962), British banker
