= Terrence Duffy =

Terrence Duffy or Terence Duffy could refer to:

- Terrence A. Duffy, American businessman
- Terry Duffy (1922–1985), British labor leader
