= Simon Andriesz =

British banker and whistleblower (1968–2026)

- Born: October 1968; United Kingdom
- Died: 23 September 2026 (aged 57); Thailand
- Occupation: Banker
- Organization: BCG Partners
- Known for: Whistle blowing

Simon Andriesz (October 1968 – 23 September 2026) was a British banker and whistleblower who uncovered evidence detailing Howard Lutnick's personal and financial relationship with Jeffrey Epstein.

== Biography ==
Andriesz was born in October 1968. He worked as managing director at BGC Group, an American finance company, where businessman Howard Lutnick served as chief executive officer.

In February 2026, Andriesz detailed evidence that Lutnick visited Little Saint James, the private island of Jeffrey Epstein, in 2012. Additionally, Andriesz stated he had discovered emails of Lutnick and Epstein discussing business start-up plans in 2018. On 9 August 2026, Andriesz posted on X stating he intended to share more evidence detailing Lutnick's relationship with Epstein.

On 23 September 2026, Andriesz died at the age of 57 in Thailand. His death was confirmed by a representative for him on Andriesz's X account. His family states that he died by suicide.
