= Electronic Broking Services =

Wholesale electronic trading platform

- Industry: Financial services
- Founded: 1990
- Successor: CME Group
- Services: electronic trading platform market-making banks

Electronic Broking Services (EBS) is a wholesale electronic trading platform used to trade on the foreign exchange market (FX) with market-making banks. It was originally created as a partnership by large banks and then became part of CME Group.

== History ==
EBS was created by a partnership of large foreign exchange (FX) market making banks in 1990 to challenge Reuters' threatened monopoly in interbank spot foreign exchange and provide effective competition. By 2007, approximately US$164 billion in spot foreign exchange transactions were traded every day over EBS's central limit order book, EBS Market.

EBS's closest competitor is London Stock Exchange Group's FX Matching service (LSEG Matching). The decision by an FX trader whether to use EBS or LSEG Matching is driven largely by the availability of a required currency pair. In practice, EBS is the primary trading venue for EUR/USD, USD/JPY, EUR/JPY, USD/CHF, EUR/CHF and USD/CNH, and LSEG Matching is the primary trading venue for commonwealth (AUD/USD, NZD/USD, USD/CAD) and emerging market currency pairs.

EBS initiated e-trading in spot precious metals, spanning spot gold, silver, platinum and palladium, and remains the leading electronic broker in spot gold and silver through the Loco London Market.

They were the first organisation to facilitate orderly black box or algorithmic trading in spot FX, through an application programming interface (API). By 2007 this accounted for 60% of all EBS flow.

In addition to spot FX and Precious Metals, EBS has expanded trading products through its venues to include NDFs, forwards and FX options. It has also increased the range of trading style to include RFQ and streaming in disclosed and non-disclosed environments.

EBS was acquired by ICAP, the world's largest inter-dealer broker, in June 2006.

In 2014, EBS merged with BrokerTec—a service provider in the fixed income markets—to form EBS BrokerTec. BrokerTec offers trading technology for many US and European fixed income products including US Treasuries, European Government Bonds and European Repo.

In 2017, EBS BrokerTec was renamed to NEX Markets and the name EBS BrokerTec ceased to exist. The names of the trading platforms, EBS and BrokerTec, remained.

In 2018, NEX Markets was acquired by CME Group.

== Structure ==
Products of the company include:

- EBS Spot: electronic FX spot broking
- EBS Spot Ai: application program interface (API) between the customer's trading system and the EBS Spot market
- EBS Prime: access for the interbank and professional trading communities to the best EBS Spot prices from an EBS Prime bank
- EBS Metals: electronic spot broking for the precious metals market
- EBS NDFs: electronic spot broking for non-deliverable FX pairs
- EBS Live: live streaming prices delivered with minimum latency direct from EBS to the customer's market data distribution platform
- EBS Ticker: third-party system distribution of EBS Spot prices
- EBS Rates: desktop view of EBS Spot prices, available through the Thomson Reuters Eikon and 3000xtra desktop as well as the Bloomberg Terminal service
- EBS Data Mine: unique and certified historical data from 1997 onwards

== See also ==
- CME Group
- NEX Group
- List of electronic trading platforms
