= Smithson Investment Trust =

British investment trust

- Company type: Public limited company
- Traded as: LSE: SSON
- Industry: Investments
- Founded: 2018; 8 years ago in London
- Founder: Terry Smith
- Defunct: February 2026
- Headquarters: London, United Kingdom
- Key people: Diana Dyer Bartlett (Chairperson)
- Products: Investment trust
- Parent: Fundsmith
- Website: www.smithson.co.uk

Smithson Investment Trust was a large British investment trust managed by Fundsmith. Created in 2018, it was dedicated to investments in small and mid sized listed or traded companies internationally with a market cap (at the time of investment) of between £500 million to £15 billion. The company was listed on the London Stock Exchange. The chairperson was Diana Dyer Bartlett.

In February 2026 the trust was closed and assets were transferred to the Smithson Equity Fund.

== History ==
In October 2018, the company was launched with an initial public offering on the London Stock Exchange, in which it raised £822.5 million, exceeding the expectations of £250 million.

In 12 November 2025, the company announced a scheme of reconstruction whereby, upon completion, the assets of the company would be transferred to the Smithson Equity Fund. It was announced that existing shareholders could get their investment redeemed in cash, or be rolled over to the fund. The reason provided for such reconstruction was the persistent discount to net asset value at which the company's shares had traded since early 2022. In anticipation of the reconstruction, the company was removed from the FTSE 250 Index on 6 February 2026. On 27 February 2026, shareholders voted in favour of the reconstruction and the company was wound up.
