= Terrence A. Duffy =

American businessman (born 1958)

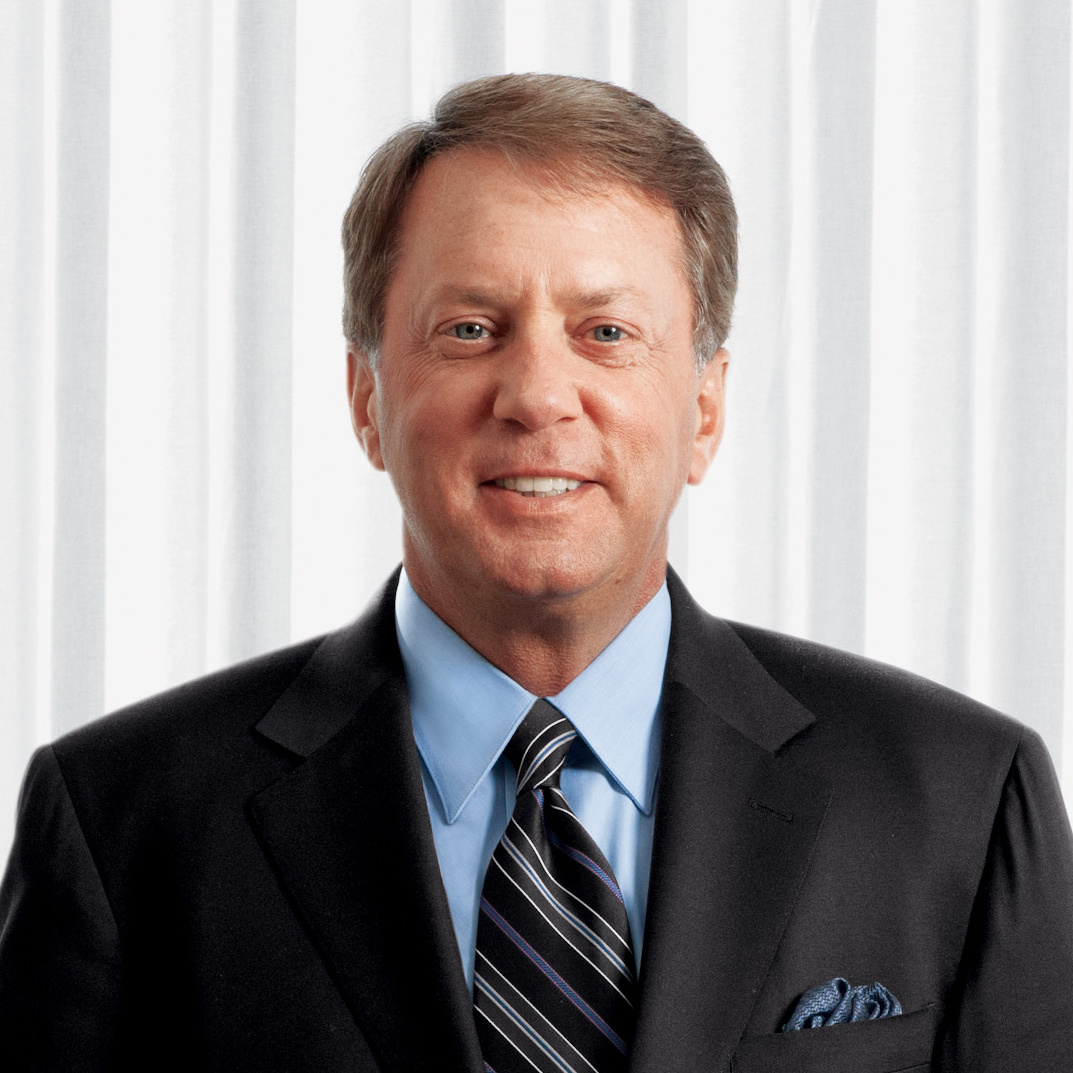
- Born: August 15, 1958 (age 67); Chicago, Illinois, U.S.
- Education: University of Wisconsin-Whitewater
- Occupation: Businessman
- Title: Chairman and CEO, CME Group
- Children: 2

Terrence A. Duffy (born August 15, 1958) is an American businessman. He is the chairman and, until March 2027, the chief executive officer of CME Group, a derivatives marketplace based in Chicago, Illinois.

Duffy began working at the Chicago Mercantile Exchange in 1980. He joined the CME board in 1995. He served as vice chairman from 1998 to 2002 and as chairman from 2002 onwards. Duffy led the company's substantial mergers and acquisitions, including the acquisitions of the Chicago Board of Trade, New York Mercantile Exchange, and NEX Group. Duffy has served in the chairman and chief executive role since November 2016.

In 2003, Duffy was appointed by President George W. Bush and confirmed by the U.S. Senate as a member of the Federal Retirement Thrift Investment Board (FRTIB), a position he held until 2013.

== Early life and education ==
Terrence A. Duffy was born on August 15, 1958, in South Side, Chicago, to John J. Duffy and Barbara Duffy. His grandfather, John J. Duffy, was a Chicago alderman who eventually became Cook County Board president.

Duffy grew up on Chicago's southwest side in the Mount Greenwood neighborhood and graduated from Leo Catholic High School in 1976. The neighborhood was home to many Chicago police and firefighters, and Duffy has said that while growing up he thought one of these positions would be his career path.

Duffy attended the University of Wisconsin-Whitewater from 1978 to 1980. While going to school, he worked nights at a bar called Chuck's in Lake Geneva, an affluent resort town popular with wealthy Chicagoans. There he met Vincent Schreiber, a Chicago Mercantile Exchange trader who convinced Duffy to take up a career in trading and eventually became his professional mentor.

== Career ==
=== Chicago Mercantile Exchange and TDA Trading ===
Duffy began working as a runner at the Chicago Mercantile Exchange in 1980, and founded his own firm, TDA Trading, in 1981.

In 1984, Duffy bought a CME membership with the help of a $50,000 loan from his parents secured by a mortgage loan they took out on their home. Shortly after he bought his membership and while working as a broker, he incurred a loss of $150,000 because of a misheard order.

Vincent Schreiber, who had introduced Duffy to the trading world several years before, helped Duffy pay back the debt by offering his guarantee to the clearing firm. Duffy continued trading by day and tending bar by night to pay back the debt over the next three years.

In 1995 Duffy joined the CME's board, and in 1998 was elected vice chairman. Duffy pushed for the CME to embrace electronic trading during this period.

In April 2002, Duffy became chairman of CME. In December 2002, CME became the first publicly traded U.S. exchange.

=== CME Group ===
In October 2006, the Chicago Mercantile Exchange announced a merger with the Chicago Board of Trade in an $8 billion deal. The combined exchanges would be known as the CME Group, and would represent the world's largest market for financial derivatives contracts. Duffy and his counterpart at the Chicago Board of Trade, Charles Carey, negotiated the deal, along with other executives. Duffy served as chairman of the combined company, and is credited with leading the CME Group's acquisition of the New York Mercantile Exchange in 2008. He began to serve as executive chairman and president in 2012, and in November 2016 took on an expanded role as chief executive officer.

In 2018, Duffy led CME Group's acquisition of London-based NEX Group. In 2021 he negotiated a deal to move CME Group's technology to Google Cloud to increase access to the company's products; the deal included a $1 billion investment by Google in CME.

Effective March 1, 2027, Duffy will resign as CEO and become executive chairman of CME.

=== Board service ===
Duffy joined the CME board in 1995 and has served as chairman of the CME Group board since 2002.

Duffy also serves on the board of directors of World Business Chicago, the board of regents for Mercy Home for Boys and Girls, the board of trustees of Saint Xavier University, and is co-chair of the Mayo Clinic Greater Chicago Leadership Council.

Duffy was appointed by President Bush and confirmed by the U.S. Senate in 2003 as a member of the Federal Retirement Thrift Investment Board (FRTIB), a position he held until 2013.

== Personal life ==
Duffy and his wife, Jenny, have twin sons. They live in Lemont, Illinois.

Duffy received a Doctor of Public Service, honoris causa, from Saint Xavier University in 2019 and a Doctor of Humane Letters from DePaul University in 2007.
