= Atlantic Computers =

Atlantic Computers plc (also Atlantic Computer Systems plc) was a British computer lessor and technology services firm, set up in 1975, that collapsed in 1990. Its fall also brought down its parent company British and Commonwealth Holdings, a financial services firm which had acquired it for £434 million in 1988.

The company leased computers systems using complex 'Flexlease' agreements, which allowed a lessee to update to a new lease after a three years or to cancel the lease after five years. These terms made Atlantic vulnerable to large liabilities incurred if invoked which were often not covered by the value of the equipment itself.

During acquisition talks, Atlantic misrepresented its contingent liabilities and by the time of its collapse, had more than £550m in debt. While its American arm filed for Chapter 11 bankruptcy on 5 July 1990, the British firm had been placed in administration with PricewaterhouseCoopers on 18 April. The group employed around 1,400 people at the time.

A report into the failure of British and Commonwealth was set up by the Department of Trade and Industry and headed by Eben Hamilton QC and James Alexander Scott, an accountant. It found that Atlantic had never made a profit from its founding in 1975. After the report's release, three former directors of Atlantic (David Austin McCormick, Nicholas Scott and Sien Yen Cheng Kai On) faced disqualification at the behest of Michael Heseltine, then President of the Board of Trade. McCormick later appealed his disqualification but it was upheld.

Many creditors had to wait for almost a decade to recoup their money after the collapses caused a string of insolvency lawsuits.

== See also ==
- Re Atlantic Computer Systems plc (No 1) - an important insolvency case regarding the administration process when a company is unable to pay its debts, resulting from Atlantic's collapse
- Soden v British and Commonwealth Holdings plc - a 1998 case regarding the collapse of Atlantic's parent company
