= BGC Group =

American financial services company

BGC Group, Inc.
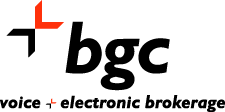
- Formerly: BGC Partners
- Type: Public
- Traded as: Nasdaq: BGC; Russell 1000 component S&P 600 component
- Industry: Banking; Financial services
- Founded: 1945; 81 years ago
- Headquarters: New York, New York, U.S. and London, UK
- Area served: Worldwide
- Key people: Howard Lutnick (former chairman & CEO)
- Products: Commercial real estate; Commodities; Credit derivatives; Equities; Equity derivatives; Fixed-income securities; Foreign exchange; Futures; Interest rate swaps; Structured products
- Revenue: ▲US$ 2.613 billion (2016)
- Operating income: ▼US$ 188.3 million (2016)
- Net income: ▼US$ 157.7 million (2016)
- Total assets: ▼US$ 3.508 billion (2016)
- Total equity: ▼US$ 1.157 billion (2016)
- Number of employees: 9,238 (2017)
- Website: www.bgcg.com

BGC Group, Inc. (formerly BGC Partners) is an American global financial services company based in New York City and London. Originally formed as part of the larger Cantor Fitzgerald organization, BGC Partners became its own entity in 2004.

== History ==
=== 1945–1990 ===
In 1945, Bernard Gerald Cantor founded a brokerage service for inter-dealer fixed-income markets. The resulting company was B.G. Cantor and Company, which later became Cantor Fitzgerald.

In 1965 Cantor Fitzgerald established an Institutional Equities Sales and Trading Division, which offers large block trading to asset managers, pension funds, and portfolio managers. In 1983, Cantor Fitzgerald became the first firm to offer worldwide screen brokerage services in US Government securities.

=== 1991–2001 ===
In 1991, Howard Lutnick was named president of Cantor Fitzgerald, after having worked at the firm for the previous eight years. Lutnick placed a new emphasis on technological innovation at the company, and in 1996 led the development of eSpeed, which went public in 1999.

The September 11 attacks claimed 658 employees of Cantor Fitzgerald and eSpeed, whose headquarters were located from floors 101 to 105 of the North Tower (1 WTC) of the World Trade Center, just above the impact zone of American Airlines Flight 11. In response to the attacks, BGC Partners and Cantor Fitzgerald pledged to donate 25% of their profits to families of deceased employees.

=== 2004–present ===
BGC Partners was formed in 2004 when Cantor Fitzgerald spun out its voice brokerage business. The initials BGC stand for that company's founder, Bernard Gerald Cantor.

In April 2005, BGC Partners LP merged with Maxcor Financial Group Inc. to form BGC Partners.

In September 2005, BGC Partners held their first annual Charity Day event. The event featured Harry Carson, Boomer Esiason, and Mariano Rivera and raised money for the Cantor Fitzgerald Relief Fund among other charities.

In 2007, BGC Partners opened an office in Seoul, South Korea and became the first inter-dealer broker to open an office in Istanbul, Turkey.

In 2008, BGC Partners merged with eSpeed and becomes BGC Partners Inc.

In November 2009, BGC Partners won Asia Risk Magazine's first-ever award for Technology Development.

In 2010, BGC Partners entered into a joint venture with state-owned China Credit Trust based in Beijing.

In May 2012 the Financial Services Authority, Britain's financial regulator, announced its decision to prohibit Anthony Verrier (a senior executive at BGC) from performing any function in relation to any regulated activity in the financial services industry. The FSA stated it believes that Verrier is not a fit and proper person due to concerns over his honesty, integrity and reputation. Its decision followed a civil court ruling that Verrier led an unlawful poaching conspiracy against rival interdealer broker Tullett Prebon and did not tell the truth about it in court.

Also in May 2012 a story was published by the New York Daily News under the headline 'Cantor Fitzgerald VP was boss from hell, secretary says in suit' which reported on a lawsuit brought against the company by former employee Crystal Mitchell. Mitchell worked as an executive assistant to Michael Lampert at BGC USA, an affiliate of Cantor Fitzgerald, in March 2011. According to the suit filed by her lawyer David Harrison, her boss once threw a cup of tea at her because she hadn't removed the teabag. "The boiling hot liquid spilled on [Mitchell], burning her stomach and upper leg, and staining her clothes." the suit said, adding that "Almost daily, Lampert humiliated and degraded Mitchell, yelling at her as if she was inferior and calling her: 'stupid,' 'moron,' 'the dumbest person I ever met,' 'incompetent,' and 'idiot,' ". Elsewhere in the discrimination suit, she says she complained about the treatment to human resource managers — but her pleas for help were ignored.

In October 2012 the New York Post ran an article entitled 'Cantor, Moody's Dogfight' reporting on a 'feud' between the company and Moody's Investors Service. The article stated that Cantor Fitzgerald and Moody's had been feuding for months over differing opinions of Cantor's profitability. In July 2012 Cantor terminated its relationship with Moody's. In October 2012 the ratings' agency dropped BGC's status to Ba2. In December 2012 Bloomberg reported that S&P cut Cantor to BBB− and left the rating for BGC Partners Inc., the company's interdealer broker affiliate, unchanged at the lowest investment grade.

Two articles appeared in January 2013 written by Bloomberg journalist Zeke Faux. The first, dated January 8 was titled 'Cantor May Face Another Ratings Cut as Fitch Cites Slump' and quoted Mohak Rao, a Fitch analyst. Rao wrote in a report "Cantor's institutional business and BGC's financial brokerage business will remain challenged in the medium term because of lower trading volume".

Two days later Zeke Faux published a second, much longer, article titled 'Cantor Growth Plan Sputters as 41% of Touted Hires Exit' citing that 41% of the 158 traders and bankers whose hirings Cantor announced in news releases since 2009 had left, according to industry records.

On April 1, 2013, NASDAQ OMX Group agreed to acquire an electronic Treasurys marketplace from brokerage firm BGC Partners Inc. in a cash-and-stock deal valued at as much as $1.23 billion. The sale caused BGC to see the biggest gain in stock prices since going public in December 1999. The assets sold to Nasdaq in this deal represented $100 million in sales in 2012, less than 6% of BGC's overall total.

On October 2, 2013, BGC's subsidiary BGC Derivative Markets, L.P. launched operations as a Swap Execution Facility (SEF), consistent with the derivatives trading regulations under the Dodd-Frank Act. This followed BGC receiving CFTC approval to operate a Swap Execution Facility in September 2013.

In February 2017, BGC bought London-based Lloyd's insurance broker, Besso Ltd. In January 2019, Ed Broking Ltd, another London headquartered Lloyd's insurance broker was added to the Group.

On July 3, 2023, the company changed its ticker from BGCP to BGC.

== Management and directors ==
- John Abularrage, co-chief executive officer
- JP Aubin, co-chief executive officer
- Sean Windeatt, co-chief executive officer and chief operating officer
- Stephen Merkel, chairman of the board, executive vice president, general counsel
- Jason W. Hauf, chief financial officer
- Mike Whitaker, chief information officer
- Brandon Lutnick, director

== Offices ==
The company's global headquarters are in Midtown, New York City, while it also has an office in the Downtown Financial District. The company and its associated businesses also operate offices around the world:

=== North America ===
- Chicago – 222 West Adams, Suite 1900, Suite 1900
- Mexico City (Remate Lince S.A.P.I. de C.V.) Vasco de Quiroga 2121 Santa Fe CDMX
- New York City – 110 59th Street, New York, NY 10022
- New York City – 55 Water Street, 20th Floor, New York, NY 10038
- Toronto (Freedom International Brokerage) – 181 University Avenue, Suite 1500, Toronto ON M5H 3M7

=== South America ===
- Rio de Janeiro (BGC Liquidez DTVM Ltda.) – Av. Almirante Barroso, 52 – 23rd Floor, Centro, Rio de Janeiro, RJ – 20031-000
- São Paulo (BGC Liquidez DTVM Ltda.) – Av. Brigadeiro Faria Lima, 3144 – 7th Floor, Jardim Paulistano, São Paulo, SP – 01451-000

=== Europe ===
- Copenhagen (BGC Brokers L.P.) – Bremerholm 1, 2nd floor, DK 1069 Copenhagen
- Hamburg (Junge & Co. Versicherungsmakler GmbH) – Hohe Bleichen 11, 20354 Hamburg
- Istanbul (BGC Partners Menkul Degerler A.S.) – Kanyon Ofis Blogu, Buyukdere cad.No:185, Kat:13 Levent/Istanbul
- London (BGC Brokers L.P.) – 5 Churchill Place, Canary Wharf, London E14 5RD
- London (ED Broking Group Limited) – 52 Leadenhall St, London EC3A 2EB
- London (Besso Limited) – 8–11 Crescent, London, EC3N 2LY
- Moscow (BGC Partners CIS, LLC.) – 4A floor, rooms 5–9, Sector A, Smolenskaya Square, 3, 121099, Moscow City, Russia
- Nyon (BGC Brokers L.P.) – Alfred Cortot 4, CH-1260 Nyon
- Paris (Aurel BGC) – 15–17 Rue Vivienne, 75002 Paris

=== Asia ===
- Beijing (BGC Capital Markets Limited) – Unit Room 506, 5/F South Block Tower C, No.2 Kexueyuan South Road, Haidian District, Beijing 100190
- Dubai (BGC Brokers L.P. Dubai; MINT Partners Dubai) – Al Fattan Currency House, Tower 2, Level 12, DIFC, PO Box 482030, Dubai
- Hong Kong (BGC Securities) – Suite 6402-08, 64/F, Two International Finance Centre, 8 Finance Street, Central, Hong Kong
- Seoul (BGC Capital Markets and Foreign Exchange Broker Limited) – 10/F Seoul Finance Center, 84 Taepyungro 1-ka, Chung-ku, Seoul, South Korea 100-768
- Singapore (BGC Partners Limited; BGC Radix Energy L.P.; BGC Securities Limited)- 1 Temasek Avenue #22-01, Millenia Tower, Singapore 039192
- Tokyo (BGC Capital Markets, LLC; BGC Shoken Kaisha Limited)- Akasaka Biz Tower 38F, 5-3-1 Akasaka, Minato-ku, Tokyo 107-6338

=== Australia ===
- Sydney (BGC Partners Pty Limited) – Level 24, 363 George Street, Sydney NSW 2000

=== Africa ===
- Johannesburg – Selborne House, Fourways Golf Park, Roos Street, Fourways, 2191

== Associated businesses ==
- Aqua Equities, joint venture with Cantor spun out in 2007
- Aurel BGC, French investment subsidiary formed in 2008
- BGC Liquidez, Brazilian subsidiary acquired in 2009
- Freedom International Brokerage, Canadian affiliate
- MINT Partners, global brokerage acquired in 2010
- Newmark Knight Frank, global real estate services. In October 2011, BGC Partners acquired Newmark Knight Frank. Six months later, in April 2012, BGC Partners also bought commercial real estate firm, Grubb & Ellis.
- BGC Radix Energy, global energy traders, acquired in 2008.
- Smith Mack, a commercial real estate firm, acquired in January 2013.
- Frederick Ross Co., a real estate brokerage firm, acquired in January 2013.
- Sterling International Brokers Limited, a currency broker, acquired in February 2013.
- RP Martin, UK broker, acquired in 2014.s
- GFI Group, a New York-based leading intermediary and provider of trading technologies and support services to the global OTC and listed markets, acquired in January 2016. The group also included Kyte broking, Latium capital.
- Sunrise Brokers, an equity derivatives broker, acquired in December 2016.
- Ed Broking Group, a global reinsurance, wholesale and specialty insurance broker with their German marine insurance arm Junge & Co. Versicherungsmakler, acquired in 2019

== Philanthropy ==
=== Global Charity Day ===
BGC Charity Day was founded in 2005 to raise money for the Cantor Fitzgerald Relief Fund and other nonprofits as a way to honor the victims of 9/11. Each year on or near September 11, BGC Charity Day brings in celebrities, athletes and politicians alike to man their phones and speak with clients, with all revenue from the day being donated to charities of choice. The Charity Day event has also spread beyond New York to all of BGC Partners' international offices.

| Year | Funds Raised (millions) | Charities Benefitted (US) | Attendees |
|---|---|---|---|
| 2005 | $3.9 | Cantor Foundation, CLIC Sargent, The Shane Warne Foundation | Boomer Esiason, Harry Carson, Mariano Rivera |
| 2006 | $5 | Safe at Home Foundation, Daniel Pitino Foundation, Happy Hearts, Minority Athletes Networking ETC, Marine Corporation Foundation for Children | Phil Simms, Rick Pitino, Petra Němcová, Joe Torre |
| 2007 | $6 | Books for Kids Project FIND, Blythedale Children's Hospital, The Cancer Research Institute, NARSAD, Project Find, Wounded Warrior Project | Eli Manning, Tony Sirico, Whoopi Goldberg, Yogi Berra, Bernie Williams, Boomer Esiason |
| 2008 | $8 | Baby Buggy, The Boomer Esiason Foundation, The Children's Institute, Ice Hockey in Harlem, Jubilee Center, Mercy Center, National Downl Syndrome Society, Project Find, Quality Services for the Autism Community, The Valerie Fund, Wounded Warrior Project | Tiki Barber, Dr. Ruth Westheimer, Michael Bloomberg, Steve Buscemi, Donald Trump |
| 2009 | $10 | The Bone Marrow Foundation, The Boomer Esiason Foundation, Childhelp, The Children's Institute, Coast to Coast Against Cancer, Friends of the Fighting 69th, Garden of Dreams, Harlem RBI, Jubilee Center, Mercy Center, Quality Services for the Autism Community, The Valerie Fund, Wounded Warrior Project | Lady Gaga, Mika Brzezinski, Joe Scarborough, Natalie Morales |
| 2010 | $10 | Baby Buggy, Bone Marrow Foundation, Boomer Esiason Foundation, Building Homes for Heroes, Childhelp, Eli Manning Foundation, The Felix Organization, Foundation for Sight and Sound, Friends of the Fighting 69th, Garden of Dreams, Harlem RBI, Jubilee Center, Level the Field, Mercy Center, Solving Kids Cancer, Team KJ, Tuesday's Children, Wounded Warrior Project, 52nd Street Project. | Hilary Duff, Edie Falco, Gabrielle Union, Mark Ruffalo, Jon Voight, Billy Crudup |
| 2011 | $12 | Alliance for Lupus Research, AmeriCares, Boomer Esiason Foundation, Building Homes for Heroes, Felix Organization, Garden of Dreams, Happy Hearts, Harlem RBI, Intrepid Sea, Air and Space, Make-a-Wish Foundation, Services for the Underserved, Solving Kids Cancer, St. Christopher's, Tony Alt Foundation, USTA Serves, Wheelchair Sports Federation, Worldwide Orphans Foundation, Wounded Warrior Project, Youth Consultation Services | Ronnie Wood, Prince Harry, Cherie Blair, Bill Clinton, Carmelo Anthony, Eli Manning, Henrik Lundqvist, Ike Davis, John McEnroe, Mark Sanchez, Rex Ryan, George W. Bush, Russell Simmons, Ben Stiller |
| 2012 | $12 | Alliance for Lupus Research, Boomer Esiason Foundation, Building Homes for Heroes, The Felix Organization, Garden of Dreams, Solving Kids' Cancer, St. Christopher's, Inc., The Tony Alt Memorial Foundation, Wounded Warrior Project, Youth Consultation Service, The 52nd Street Project, The Allan Houston Legacy Foundation | Susan Sarandon, Edie Falco, Curtis "50 Cent" Jackson, Rudy Giuliani, Carmelo Anthony, Mike Woodson, John McEnroe, Andrew Garfield, Carol Alt, Eli Manning, Rex Ryan, Mark Sanchez, Mike Tannenbaum |
| 2013 | $12 | The 52nd Street Project, The Allan Houston Legacy Foundation, Alliance for Lupus Research, Baby Buggy, Boomer Esiason Foundation, Boys Hope Girls Hope of New York, Building Homes for Heroes, Carmelo Anthony Foundation, Catalog for Giving of NYC, Emergency Children's Help Organization, G-Unity Foundation, Garden of Dreams Foundation, Game Knights, Harlem RBI, Jason Kidd Foundation, Only Make Believe, Point of Hope, Self Help Africa, Solving Kids' Cancer, St. Mary's Healthcare System for Children, Todd Ouida Children's Foundation, Tony Alt Memorial Foundation, Wounded Warrior Project, Generation Rescue, The Noreen Fraser Foundation | Prince Harry and Prince William, Zachary Quinto, Curtis "50 Cent" Jackson, Sean "Diddy" Combs, Caitlyn Jenner (then Bruce), (Note: Jenner changed her name due to gender transition in 2015.)Julianne Moore, Billy Crystal, Tony Sirico, Bobby Cannavale, Edie Falco, Jenny McCarthy, Boomer Esiason, Craig Carton, Carmelo Anthony, Metta World Peace, Jason Kidd and Deron Williams, Mark Teixeira, Ryan Lochte, Nick Cannon, Carol Alt and Lily Aldridge. |
| 2014 | $12 | Harlem RBI, Sparks, Liya Kebede Foundation, Christina Noble Children's Foundation, The Orphanage Trust, Bali Kids, The Sumba Foundation, Marie Curie Cancer Care, WellChild, The Carmelo Anthony Foundation, The Catalog for Giving of New York City, St. Joseph Home, Dallagio Foundation, Cantor Fitzgerald Relief Fund, ChildFund Korea, Duang Prateep Foundation, Futaba Infant Home, CHICKS, Place2Be, Starlight, Anthony Nolan, Haven House Children's Hospice, Nordoff Robins, Point of Hope, The White Knight Foundation | Allan Houston, Gerry Cooney, John Franco, Tim Hardaway Jr., Curtis "50 Cent" Jackson, Jenny McCarthy, John Turturro, Nick Jonas, Rooney Mara, Vincent Pastore, Linda Evangelista, Kelly Bensimon, Amanda Holden, Barbara Windsor, Clive Owen, Damian Lewis, David Gandy, Kirsty Gallacher, Sean Bean, Terence Stamp, Boris Becker, David Gower, Manu Tuilagi, Matt Dawson, Sir Jackie Stewart |
| 2015 | $12 | Wounded Warrior Project, Beyond Social Services, Seeing is Believing, SAVH, Sweet Louise, 52nd Street Project, The New York Police & Fire Widow's and Children's Benefit Fund, The Henrik, Lundqvist Foundation, Boys' Town, Breast Cancer Care, Elephant Family, Mencap, Reverse rett, Sur Les Bancs de l'Ecole, Stroke Association, Great Ormand Street Hospital Charity, Haven House Children's Hospice, Jamie Oliver Food Foundation, Boomer Esiason Foundation, Friends of Firefighters, Kookaburra Kids, Leukaemia Foundation, Maggie's Cancer Caring Centre, NSPCC, Kevin Pietersen Foundation | AnnaLynne McCord, AnnaSophia Robb, Bridget Moynahan, Kevin Kline, Margot Robbie, Pamela Anderson, Steve Buscemi, Boomer Esiason, Jenny McCarthy, Henrik Lundqvist, Woody Johnson, Sarah, Duchess of York, Amanda Donohoe, Joanna Lumley, Samuel L Jackson, Tom Hardy, Chris Tarrant, Jamie Oliver, Piers Morgan, Darren Gough, Kevin Pietersen, Lewis Moody, Jodie Kidd, The Countess of Wessex |
| 2016 | $12 | Building Homes for Heroes, Beyond Social Services, Les Voilas, SAVH, Sweet Louise, 52nd Street Project, The New York Police & Fire Widow's and Children's Benefit Fund, The Henrik, A21, Boys' Town, Breast Cancer Care, Action Medical Research, Mencap, Children in Crisis, DKMS, Sur Les Bancs de l'Ecole, Stroke Association, Great Ormond Street Hospital Charity, Haven House Children's Hospice, Garden of Dreams, Boomer Esiason Foundation, Friends of Firefighters, Kookaburra Kids, Leukaemia Foundation, Maggie's Cancer Caring Centre, NSPCC, Dikembe Mutombo Foundation | Robert De Niro, Steve Buscemi, Bridget Moynahan, Carla Gugino, Malin Akerman, Edie Falco, Darryl "DMC" McDaniels, Vincent Pastore, AnnaSophia Robb, Juliana Margulies, Rosie Perez, Uzo Aduba, Tony Danza, Peyton Manning, Eli Manning, Walt Frazier, Chris Snee, Dikembe Mutombo, Dwight Gooden, Jason Pierre-Paul, Justin Pugh, Maria Sharapova, Matt Harvey, Shaquille O'Neal, Shaun O'Hara, Steve Weatherford, Woody Johnson, CC Sabathia, Michael Massimino, Daniel Nigro, Willis Reed, Gerry Cooney, Joe Namath, Allan Houston, Constance Jablonski, Lily Aldridge, Damaris Lewis |
| 2017 | | | |
| 2018 | | | |
| 2019 | | | |
| 2020 | $10 | | Matthew McConaughey, Kevin Durant, Patrick Dempsey, Alec Baldwin, Ed Norton, Kristen Bell, Spencer Dinwiddie, CJ Mosley, Victor Cruz, John Stamos, Goldie Hawn, Tony Gonzalez, Patrick Reed, David Costabile, Billy Crudup, Edie Falco, John Slattery, Matthew Rhys, Steve Buscemi, Allan Houston, Mark Messier, Jim Leyritz, Darryl "DMC" McDaniels, Kathryn Winnick, Jeff Ross, Mark Teixeria, Gerry Cooney, Petra Nemcova, Tony Blair, Henrik Lundqvist, Nick Swisher, Steve Nash, Brian Cashman, Rosie Perez, Virginia Williams |
| 2021 | $12 | | Bill Clinton, Tony Blair, Steve Buscemi, John Starks, Nick Swisher, Carol Alt, Brady Skjei, Victor Cruz, Harry Lennix, Rosie Perez, Cindy Crawford, Johnny Damon, Coco Rocha, Spencer Dinwiddie, Kimiko Glenn, Jim Leyritz, Richard Kind, Billy Crystal, Steven Matz, Ron Guidry, Lias Andersson, Mika Zibanejad, Tino Martinez, Brian Cashman, Chuck Liddell, Ilana Glazer, Caris LeVert, Dr. Ruth Westheimer, Kevin Knox, Victor Olapido, Candice Swanepoel, Shannon Elizabeth |
| 2022 | | | |

=== Hurricane Sandy relief ===
When Hurricane Sandy hit the New York and New Jersey coasts in October 2012, damages quickly totaled in the billions, with thousands of family homes completely destroyed along beach properties. A Hurricane Sandy Family Relief Program was established and funded largely by BGC Partners and Cantor Fitgerald's Charity Day efforts. $10 million in the form of $1,000 debit cards were handed out to families whose homes were damaged in the storm. The eligible families were identified through nineteen schools located in areas hardest hit by the storm.

Cantor Fitzgerald Slacks On 9/11 Pledge, But Promises $10 Million To Sandy Relief

=== Oklahoma Tornado relief ===
On May 20, 2013, a tornado struck Moore, Oklahoma, killing 24 people and injuring hundreds more. Two days later, Howard Lutnick appeared on the Piers Morgan Live TV show and pledged to donate $2 million to families affected by the tornado. The donation was given out in the form of $1,000 debit cards distributed to area families.

== Sponsorship ==
In 2012 the company became the title sponsor of the Masters snooker tournament.
