= Fundsmith =

London-based investment management company

- Industry: Investment
- Genre: Fund Management
- Founded: November 1, 2010; 16 years ago in London, England
- Founder: Terry Smith
- Headquarters: Cavendish Square, London, England
- Number of locations: 3
- Area served: Global
- Key people: Terry Smith CEO and CIO; Mark Laurence COO; Paul Mainwaring CFO; Julian Robins Head of Research
- Products: Open-ended equity funds and investment trusts
- Services: Financial services
- AUM: ▲£36bn (December 2023)
- Number of employees: 59 (2023)
- Website: https://www.fundsmith.co.uk

Fundsmith is a London-based investment management company, founded in 2010 by Terry Smith. As of December 2023, Fundsmith manages £36bn in assets. Smith has been referred to as "the English Warren Buffett" after achieving superior investment returns with strategies similar to the U.S. investor.

Fundsmith employs a long-term, buy-and-hold approach. Its funds seek to own concentrated portfolios of quoted businesses chosen on the basis of company fundamentals, defensible competitive advantages, and attractive valuation.

== Investment strategy ==
Fundsmith looks for companies generating high returns on capital and operating in sectors driven by a large number of everyday, repeat events and transactions, such as consumer staples and medical consumables. The company avoids emerging technology firms and heavily cyclical industries, such as airlines and real estate. Smith does not invest in banks, owing to their reliance on leverage and financial engineering. He was the No.1 rated bank analyst at Barclays in London from 1984-89.

Fundsmith also looks for companies with an established competitive advantage, for example, Automatic Data Processing, the payroll processor whose large installed base of software is said by Smith to give such firms "annuity-like characteristics". As Smith told The Telegraph newspaper in 2015: "The reality is that we don't seek to predict who will win, but rather to bet on a company that has already won."

Fundsmith invests on behalf of individuals, wealth managers, institutions, private banks, prominent families, charities and endowments. Smith invests his own money in the fund, having over £250m in it.

Retail investors in Fundsmith Equity Fund are charged 1% in management fees each year; the fund charges no performance fees, initial fees or redemption fees. The fund also eschews the higher operational costs associated with frequent dealing.

== Funds ==
Fundsmith is the manager and administrator of a number of investment funds. Fundsmith LLP is the Authorised Corporate Director of two UK open-ended investment companies (“OEIC”), Fundsmith Equity Fund and Fundsmith Sustainable Equity Fund; the alternative investment fund manager for a UK investment trust, Smithson Investment Trust, and for three US limited partnerships. Fundsmith LLP is the manager of four segregated accounts. Fundsmith LLP is the global distributor of the Fundsmith SICAV.

=== Fundsmith Equity Fund ===
Investing on a global basis, the Fundsmith Equity Fund invests in businesses that can sustain a high return on capital employed; whose advantages are difficult to replicate and largely impervious to technological change; and where growth is generated through re-invested cash flows.

Fundsmith states it will hold 20-30 companies in its portfolio at any time; Smith has said that there are no more than 70 stocks in the world that match Fundsmith's investment criteria; their history typically spans several decades and multiple economic cycles.

The fund invests in companies with large market capitalizations with shares that can be easily traded, to maintain liquidity for investors.

To August 2024, the fund had returned 599.9% since inception in November 2010, achieving an annualised growth rate of 15.1%; over the same period the fund outperformed growth in the MCSI World Index of Equities (371.8%) and UK bonds (~~4~~26.3%). According to Bloomberg, the fund's performance (as of August 2019) puts it in the 97th, 99th and 99th percentiles vs. global peers on a trailing 1-, 3- and 5-year basis, respectively.

=== Fundsmith Sustainable Equity Fund ===
In November 2017, Fundsmith launched the Fundsmith Sustainable Equity Fund, aimed at institutional investors and charities. It was developed from investments Terry Smith managed for Comic Relief. The fund has a sustainable objective and excludes investments in sectors such as oil, tobacco and gambling.

=== Fundsmith SICAV ===
Fundsmith SICAV operates two sub-funds, Fundsmith Equity Fund and Fundsmith Sustainable Equity Fund. They are managed with the same process as the UK OEICs, Fundsmith Equity Fund and Fundsmith Sustainable Equity Fund.

=== Fundsmith Limited Partnerships ===
Fundsmith operates three Delaware Limited Partnerships; Fundsmith Equity L.P., Fundsmith Sustainable Equity Fund L.P. and Smithson L.P., which follow the same process as the UK OEICs, Fundsmith Equity L.P., Fundsmith Sustainable Equity Fund L.P., and the UK-listed Smithson Investment Trust.

=== Smithson Investment Trust ===
Smithson Investment Trust is a listed closed-end investment trust launched in 2018 (LSE: SSON).

Smithson invests globally in 25 to 40 small and mid-sized listed companies – between £500 million to £15 billion in size. Smithson follows Fundsmith long-term investment approach. The portfolio manager of Smithson is Simon Barnard.

=== Fundsmith Emerging Equities Trust ===
Fundsmith Emerging Equities Trust was an emerging markets investment trust that was put into voluntary liquidation in 2022 as a result of failure to deliver adequate investment performance. The fund made a return of 27%.

== Operations ==
Fundsmith is headquartered in the West End of London, with affiliates in the USA and Mauritius. The firm employs 59 people. Smith serves as CEO and CIO, and makes investment decisions along with Fundsmith's Head of Research Julian Robins, with whom he first worked more than 30 years ago.

== Key People ==
Terry Smith, MNZM, is chief executive and Chief Investment Officer of Fundsmith LLP, and a former chief executive of Collins Stewart and Tullett Prebon. Smith first rose to prominence after the 1992 publication of his book Accounting for Growth, which exposed the misleading accounting practices adopted by bankrupt (but apparently successful) firms in the 90s. Smith was fired by his employer for refusing to withdraw the book; it went on to be one of the UK's bestselling non-fiction titles.

Julian Robins co-founded Fundsmith in 2010 and is Partner and Head of Research.
