= Exco International =

Defunct British money brokering company

- Type: Public
- Industry: Money brokering
- Founded: 1965
- Defunct: 1998
- Fate: Acquired
- Successor: ICAP
- Headquarters: London, UK
- Key people: Richard Lacy (Chairman)

Exco International was a leading British money brokering company. It was listed on the London Stock Exchange and was once a constituent of the FTSE 100 Index but was acquired by British & Commonwealth Holdings in 1986.

== History ==
The Company was established as a money brokering business in 1965 under the name of Astley & Pearce. It subsequently merged with Godsell & Co, another money brokering business.

In 1978 it was the subject of a management buyout from Gerrard & National who previously owned it. It was first listed on the London Stock Exchange in 1981.

The Company was acquired by British & Commonwealth Holdings in 1986.

When British & Commonwealth Holdings collapsed the business was sold off as Exco plc. In 1998 it acquired Intercapital plc in a reverse takeover. It has now been integrated into the ICAP Group.
