= Royal Trust Bank v Buchler =

Royal Trust Bank v Buchler [1989] BCLC 130 is a UK insolvency law case, which decided that before a creditor may enforce security, it must show it is appropriate to do so.

== Facts ==
Mr Buchler's company borrowed £500,000 from Royal Trust Bank. It purchased and refurbished some property to let it out again. The loan was secured by a charge entitling the bank to appoint a receiver. When an administrator was appointed, he decided it would be best to go ahead letting the property and then sell. Letting failed. The administrator decided to sell. The property got £850,000, and the bank sought leave under the Insolvency Act 1986 s.11(3) (see now, Schedule B) to enforce its security.

== Judgment ==
Peter Gibson J refused the bank leave. He held the bank failed to discharge its burden of showing a proper case to enforce security. The decision to delay the property's sale was a sound one, and if it was sold the bank could be paid in full. If the bank was allowed to appoint a receiver, costs would be increased, which would decrease assets available to all creditors.

== See also ==
- UK insolvency law
