= Terry Smith (businessman) =

British businessman (born 1953)

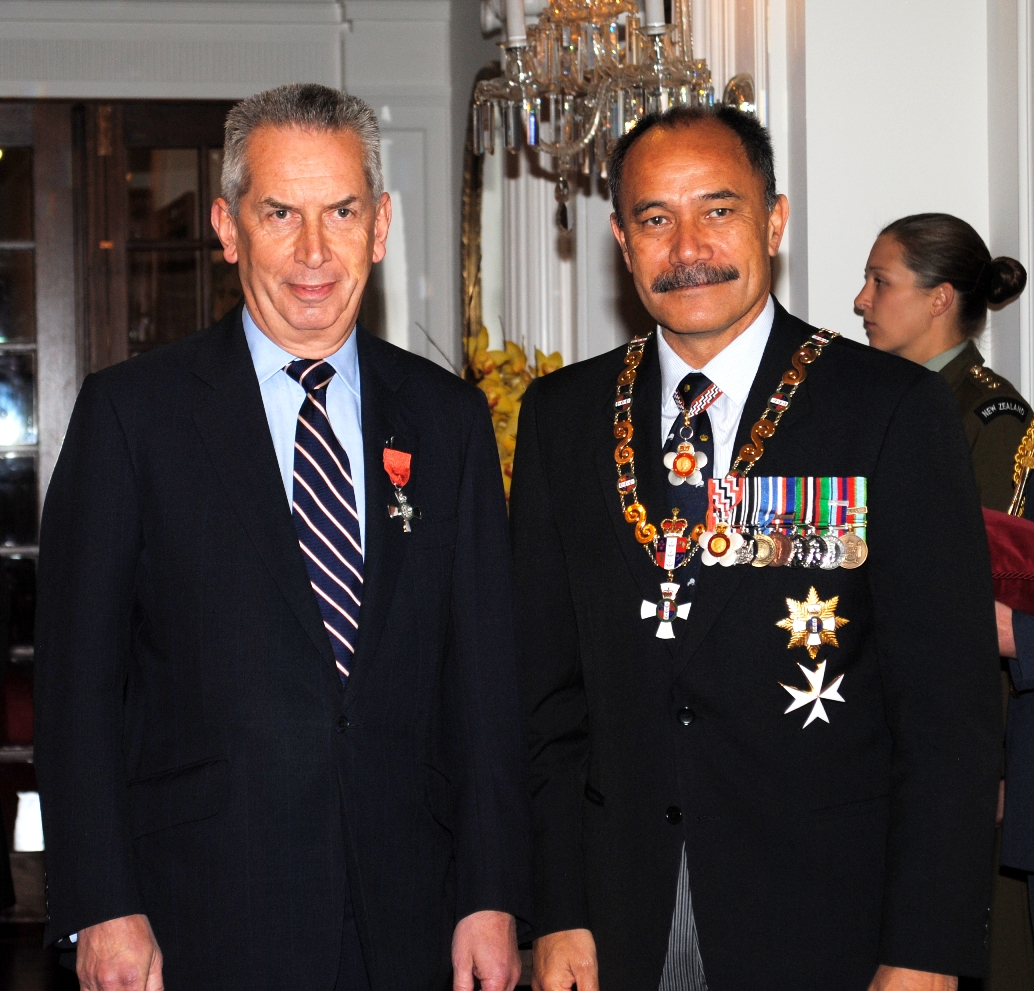
Smith (left), after his investiture as a Member of the New Zealand Order of Merit by the governor-general, Sir Jerry Mateparae, in 2012

Terence Smith MNZM (born 15 May 1953) is an English fund manager who is the founder and chief executive of Fundsmith. He was formerly the chief executive of Tullett Prebon and Collins Stewart. He is an author and a media commentator on investment issues.

He has been referred to as "the English Warren Buffett" for his style of growth investing, which involves buying and holding shares in a relatively small number of established companies.

Smith was made a Member of the New Zealand Order of Merit in 2012, after his work in recognising the contribution of Sir Keith Park during the Battle of Britain. In 2016, Smith received an Honorary Fellowship from Cardiff University.

The Sunday Times Rich List has estimated his wealth to be £300 million.

== Early life ==
Smith grew up in East London where he attended Stratford Grammar School before reading history at University College Cardiff in 1974, graduating with a First. He turned down an offer of a research fellowship to pursue a business career.

== Early career ==
Smith worked for Barclays Bank from 1973 to 1984. He managed the Pall Mall branch before transferring to the firm's finance department, where he developed an interest in stock analysis. He obtained an MBA from Henley Management College in 1979.

He left Barclays to work at W. Greenwell & Co. as a research analyst. Later he joined Barclays de Zoete Wedd, holding the position of the top-rated bank analyst in London from 1984-89.

In 1990 he was appointed Head of UK Company Research at UBS Phillips & Drew, a position from which he was dismissed in 1992 following the publication of his best-selling book Accounting for Growth.

== Accounting for Growth ==
In 1990 a series of high-profile FTSE 100 public companies went bust, including Polly Peck and British and Commonwealth. Whilst working for UBS Phillips & Drew, Smith's clients wanted to know why these firms had failed despite posting apparently healthy profits. In response, Smith wrote an analysts circular showing that these firms had run into difficulties with cash flow, rather than profitability, and in some cases had used deliberately misleading accounting techniques.

Smith's paper examined 12 of these techniques; the paper's title, Accounting for Growth, was intended as a pun. The paper was well-received and led to a book publishing contract with Random House. UBS asked Smith to withdraw the book. Both Smith and Random House refused. UBS suspended Smith before firing and suing him. Smith counter-sued; the two parties settled out of court 18 months later.

The controversy helped propel the book to the top of the bestsellers chart, displacing Stephen Hawking's A Brief History of Time from the no.1 spot and eventually selling over 100 000 copies.

== Collins Stewart and Tullett Prebon ==
Smith joined Collins Stewart in 1992, shortly after being fired from UBS. He became a director in 1996; in 2000 he became Chief Executive after leading a management buy-out. The company floated on the London Stock Exchange in the same year. In 2003, Collins Stewart acquired Tullett Liberty, and then in 2004 acquired Prebon Group, creating Tullett Prebon, the world's second largest inter-dealer broker.

Collins Stewart and Tullett Prebon were demerged in December 2006. Smith served as chairman of the demerged Collins Stewart entity from 2006 to 2010. In September 2014, Smith announced his retirement from Tullett Prebon in order to concentrate on Fundsmith.

== Fundsmith ==
In 2010 Smith set up a new business, Fundsmith, a fund management company headquartered in London. The business has one strategy - to seek to buy good companies, try not to overpay and then do nothing. Fundsmith was set up to be the main vehicle for Smith's investments; he now has over £250m invested in Fundsmith Equity Fund. As of December 2022, Fundsmith manages over £35bn.

Smith is a noted critic of the established fee structure of investment management firms, claiming that most managers churn their stocks too many times, and that retail investors often lose the bulk of gains to excessive management fees and expenses. Writing in the Financial Times, Smith has used a Tour de France analogy to explain his long-term investment philosophy. He states that it is pointless to search for a fund manager who can perform well in all market conditions, likening them to cyclists in the Tour, which "has never been won by a rider who won every stage, and it never will. Like the Tour, investment is a test of endurance, and the winner will be the investor who finds a good strategy or fund and sticks with it".

== Other interests ==
Smith is a media contributor and has written for a number of outlets, including a regular column for the Financial Times. Until 2013 he kept a blog, Terry Smith Straight Talking, writing extensively on financial and political issues. Smith is a eurosceptic and advocated the United Kingdom's exit from the European Union. In the 1997 United Kingdom general election he stood for parliament in the constituency of West Chelmsford as the candidate for the Referendum Party.

Smith studied history and remains interested in the subject, particularly military history. In 2008, Smith initiated then led and was chairman of the Sir Keith Park Memorial Campaign that erected a statue of Sir Keith Park on the Fourth plinth in Trafalgar Square, in recognition of his work as commander of No. 11 Group during the Battle of Britain. A permanent statue was subsequently erected in Waterloo Place, London, and was unveiled on 15 September 2010, the 70th anniversary of the Battle.

In recognition of Smith's efforts, he was appointed a Member of the New Zealand Order of Merit in the 2012 New Year Honours, for services to New Zealand–United Kingdom relations.

In 2016, Cardiff University awarded Smith, an alumnus of the university, an Honorary Fellowship.

Debrett's People of Today lists Smith's interests as boxing, shooting and flying. He is also a competitive cyclist and an exponent of Muay Thai.

== Personal life ==
Smith was married to Barbara, with two daughters.

Smith is involved since 2021 in a number legal disputes with his ex-partner of 13 years. Smith had accused his ex-partner of larceny of household items but the case was struck off on 11 April 2022.
