= British and Commonwealth Holdings =

British & Commonwealth Holdings
- House flag

- Coat of arms
- Company type: Public company
- Industry: Financial services
- Founded: 1955
- Defunct: 1990
- Fate: Administration
- Headquarters: London, England
- Key people: John Gunn (formerly CEO)

British and Commonwealth Holdings plc was a financial services company formerly listed on the London Stock Exchange.

== History ==
Commodore's flag of British and Commonwealth Shipping Company

The company was originally established in 1955 when Clan Line Steamers was merged with Union Castle to form The British & Commonwealth Shipping Company, a shipping business. Until 1987 its major shareholder was Caledonia Investments, which since 1951 has been controlled by Clan Line's founding Cayzer family.

British & Commonwealth were the ultimate owners of British United Airways (BUA), the United Kingdom's largest wholly private, independent airline of the 1960s, as well as its subsidiaries and sister companies, including British United Air Ferries and British United Island Airways (BUIA). It was also a shareholder in Bristow Helicopters, at the time the UK's biggest helicopter company as well as one of the largest in the world, acquiring full control in 1985.

In 1969 British and Commonwealth Shipping, Furness Withy, P&O and the Ocean Steamship Company established Overseas Containers Limited to exploit containerisation.

In late 1970 British & Commonwealth sold BUA along with three new BAC One-Eleven 500 aircraft it had leased to the airline to Caledonian Airways for £12 million. It continued to own BUIA, which had changed its name to British Island Airways in July 1970.

== 1980s boom and bust ==
In the 1980s, new management under John Gunn oversaw rapid expansion in financial services. This wasn't a totally new area for the company: it had established fund managers Gartmore in 1969. Multiple acquisitions included Exco International, a UK money brokering business in 1986, and Oppenheimer Holdings, a large American fund management company.

At its height, the company was said to be "the largest financial services company in the UK, if the 4 high-street banks are excluded". Favourable profiles in the business press culminated in John Gunn being awarded the accolade "Guardian Young Businessman of the Year".

In 1988 it acquired Atlantic Computers, a computer services business for £434m, having first built up a stake in that company by way of a series of market purchases. The acquisition proved ruinous – "accounting irregularities" were discovered in Atlantic's books: the company had been building up huge contingent liabilities due to its 'Extended Paperwork' practice.

Both acquiror and acquiree subsequently went into administration (the former in 1990, the latter during the late 1990s). Until its collapse, British & Commonwealth had also been the majority shareholder of Air UK, at the time the UK's largest regional airline and BIA's successor, and also Servisair the airline and cargo ground handling company based, at the time, in Bramhall.

== See also ==
- Re Atlantic Computer Systems plc (No 1)

== Bibliography ==
- Eglin, Roger & Ritchie, Berry (1980). Fly me, I'm Freddie. London, England: Weidenfeld & Nicolson. ISBN 0-297-77746-7.
- Thomson, Adam (1999). High Risk: The Politics of the Air. London, England: Sidgwick & Jackson. ISBN 0-283-99599-8.
