= CME Group =

American financial derivatives company

CME Group Inc.
- Formerly: Chicago Mercantile Exchange Holdings Inc.
- Type: Public
- Traded as: Nasdaq: CME (Class A); S&P 500 component
- Industry: Financial Services
- Founded: Oldest exchange 1848; 178 years ago; Merger 2007; 19 years ago
- Headquarters: Chicago, Illinois, U.S.
- Key people: Terrence A. Duffy (chairman & CEO), retiring as CEO in March 2027; Lynne Fitzpatrick (CFO; to be CEO in March 2027)
- Services: Electronic trading platform clearing
- Revenue: ▲US$6.520 billion (2025)
- Operating income: ▲US$4.229 billion (2025)
- Net income: ▲US$4.072 billion (2025)
- Total assets: ▲US$198.424 billion (2025)
- Total equity: ▲US$28.728 billion (2025)
- Number of employees: 3,875 (2025)
- Subsidiaries: Chicago Mercantile Exchange; Chicago Board of Trade; New York Mercantile Exchange; Commodities Exchange, Inc.; NEX Group; Kansas City Board of Trade
- Rating: S&P Global: Short-term A1+; Long-term AA− Moody's Ratings: Short-term Prime-1; Long-term Aa3
- Website: www.cmegroup.com

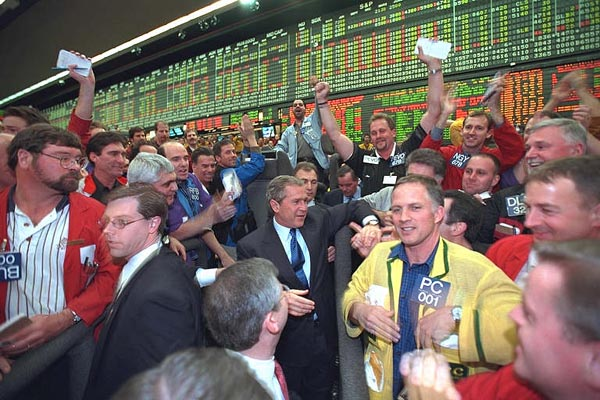
President George W. Bush at the CME on March 6, 2001

CME Group Inc. (formerly Chicago Mercantile Exchange Holdings Inc.), headquartered in Chicago, Illinois, operates exchanges and provides clearing services for trading in financial derivatives such as futures contracts, options, and swaps. Its exchanges include the Chicago Mercantile Exchange (CME), the Chicago Board of Trade (CBOT), the New York Mercantile Exchange (NYMEX), and the Commodity Exchange (COMEX). The company also owns 27% of S&P Dow Jones Indices. The company operates the Globex Trading System, an electronic trading platform that allows customers in approximately 150 countries to trade futures and options contracts. The company also operates two platforms for spot market trading: BrokerTec, which facilitates dealer-to-dealer trading in fixed-income products, and EBS, which provides spot trading in foreign exchange markets. CME Clearing serves as a counterparty to every transaction cleared by the company.

Financial derivatives traded on CME's exchanges are tied to interest rates (primarily SOFR or United States Treasury securities; 51% of 2025 volume), stock market indexes (primarily E-mini contracts on the S&P 500 and Nasdaq-100; 26% of 2025 volume), energy-related products (primarily oil and natural gas; 10% of 2025 volume), agricultural products (primarily corn, soybeans, and wheat; 7% of 2025 volume), exchange currencies (primarily with the Euro, Japanese yen, British pound, and Australian dollar; 3% of 2025 volume), metals (primarily gold, silver, and copper; 3% of 2025 volume), and cryptocurrency (primarily Bitcoin and Ether; negligible volume in 2025). Institutional trading represents 85% to 90% of the company's trading volume.

In 2025, 81% of the company's revenues were from clearing and transaction fees, 12% of revenues were from market data fees, and 7% of revenues were from other sources, primarily access and communication fees. In 2025, over 7 billion futures and options contracts were traded on the company's platforms; the company received average fees of $0.70 per contract traded. The company has witnessed increased trading volumes during periods of high market volatility.

== History ==
The Chicago Mercantile Exchange (CME), was founded in 1898 as a nonprofit corporation. In 1919, it established its clearing house. In 1982, CME introduced the first successful stock index futures contract, helping change equity risk management and creating today's equity index derivatives market. In 2000, CME demutualized and became a joint stock company. In 2002, CME Holdings Company, the parent company of CME, became a public company via an initial public offering.

In June 2007, the company, in partnership with Dubai Holding and Oman Investment Authority, launched the Dubai Mercantile Exchange, of which it owns 33%.

In July 2007, CME merged with the holding company for the Chicago Board of Trade, founded in 1848, in an $8 billion transaction that created the world's largest financial market, and became CME Group Inc., a CME/Chicago Board of Trade Company.

In August 2008, CME Group acquired New York Mercantile Exchange (NYMEX), owner of both the NYMEX exchange and the Commodity Exchange (COMEX), for $8.9 billion in cash and CME Group stock.

In February 2010, CME Group agreed to purchase 90% of Dow Jones & Company's financial-indexes business, including the Dow Jones Industrial Average. CME Group and Dow Jones & Company subsequently contributed the Dow Jones Indexes to the formation of S&P Dow Jones Indices, with CME Group receiving a 24.4% ownership interest and Dow Jones & Company receiving a 2.6% ownership interest in the joint venture. In April 2013, CME Group purchased the Dow Jones & Company interest for $80 million, increasing CME Group's interest in S&P Dow Jones Indices from 24.4% to 27.0%.

In May 2010, the 2010 flash crash was caused when Navinder Singh Sarao, a British financial trader, used spoofing algorithms to place orders for thousands of E-Mini S&P futures contracts via CME's Globex platform. He later replaced or modified those orders at least 19,000 times before they were cancelled. The event led to the implementation of coordinated cross-market trading curbs; CME's Globex platform had automatically halted trading, while the New York Stock Exchange did not.

In March 2012, Phupinder Gill, was promoted from president and chief operating officer to CEO of the company.

In July 2012, the company sold Credit Market Analysis Limited to S&P Global.

In December 2012, CME Group acquired the Kansas City Board of Trade, the dominant venue for the sale of hard red winter wheat, for $126 million in cash.

In October 2014, the company announced 150 layoffs.

In February 2015, the company announced it will close most open outcry trading pits since they were replaced by electronic trading platforms.

In March 2016, the firm announced the sale of its suburban Chicago data center in Aurora, Illinois to CyrusOne for $130 million, in a leaseback transaction.

In November 2016, Gill retired as CEO and Terrence A. Duffy, then executive chairman and president of the company, took on an expanded role as its CEO.

In November 2018, CME Group acquired London-based NEX Group for $5.5 billion.

In September 2021, the company, in partnership with IHS Market (later S&P Global), formed OSTTRA, a provider of post-trade solutions for the global OTC market. In October 2025, OSTTRA was sold to investment funds managed by KKR & Co. for $3.1 billion.

In November 2021, CME agreed to move its trading systems to Google Cloud under a 10-year partnership; Google invested $1 billion for 4,584,020 shares ($217/share) of CME.

In July 2023, the company announced approximately 100 layoffs.

In May 2024, the company launched trading in spot Bitcoin. It has offered trading in Bitcoin futures contracts since 2017.

In December 2025, the company formed a joint venture with FanDuel, of which CME owns 51%, to launch a prediction markets mobile app that offers retail customers event contracts based on major financial and economic benchmarks as well as on sports. CME handles the clearing aspects while FanDuel handles the technology aspects.

In February 2026, the company announced plans to launch future contracts for trading in rare-earth elements. In May 2026, the company announced plans to launch futures contracts for trading in uranium.

Effective March 2027, Terrence A. Duffy will resign as CEO and will be replaced by CFO Lynne Fitzpatrick.

== Corporate affairs ==
=== Finances ===
CME revenue and net income in billion US$
Year	Revenue	Net income
2025	6.521	4.0
2024	6.130	3.5
2023	5.579	3.2
2022	5.020	2.7
2021	4.689	2.6
2020	4.884	2.1
2019	4.868	2.1
2018	4.310	2.0
2017	3.645	4.1 (or 1.6 without one-time tax benefit from TCJA)
2016	3.595	1.5
2015	3.327	1.2
2014	3.112	1.1
2013	2.937	1.0
2012	2.915	0.9

=== Board governance ===
The company's board of directors consists of 19 members, compared to an average of 11 members for companies in the S&P 500. Holders of Class B shares, representing owners of exchange seats, have the right to elect 6 members. In August 2018, the company offered holders of Class B shares about $10 million to relinquish control of their board seats. The proposal was rejected by shareholders. A similar proposal was introduced in 2026 but failed to reach the required quorum of Class B shareholders.

== Offices ==
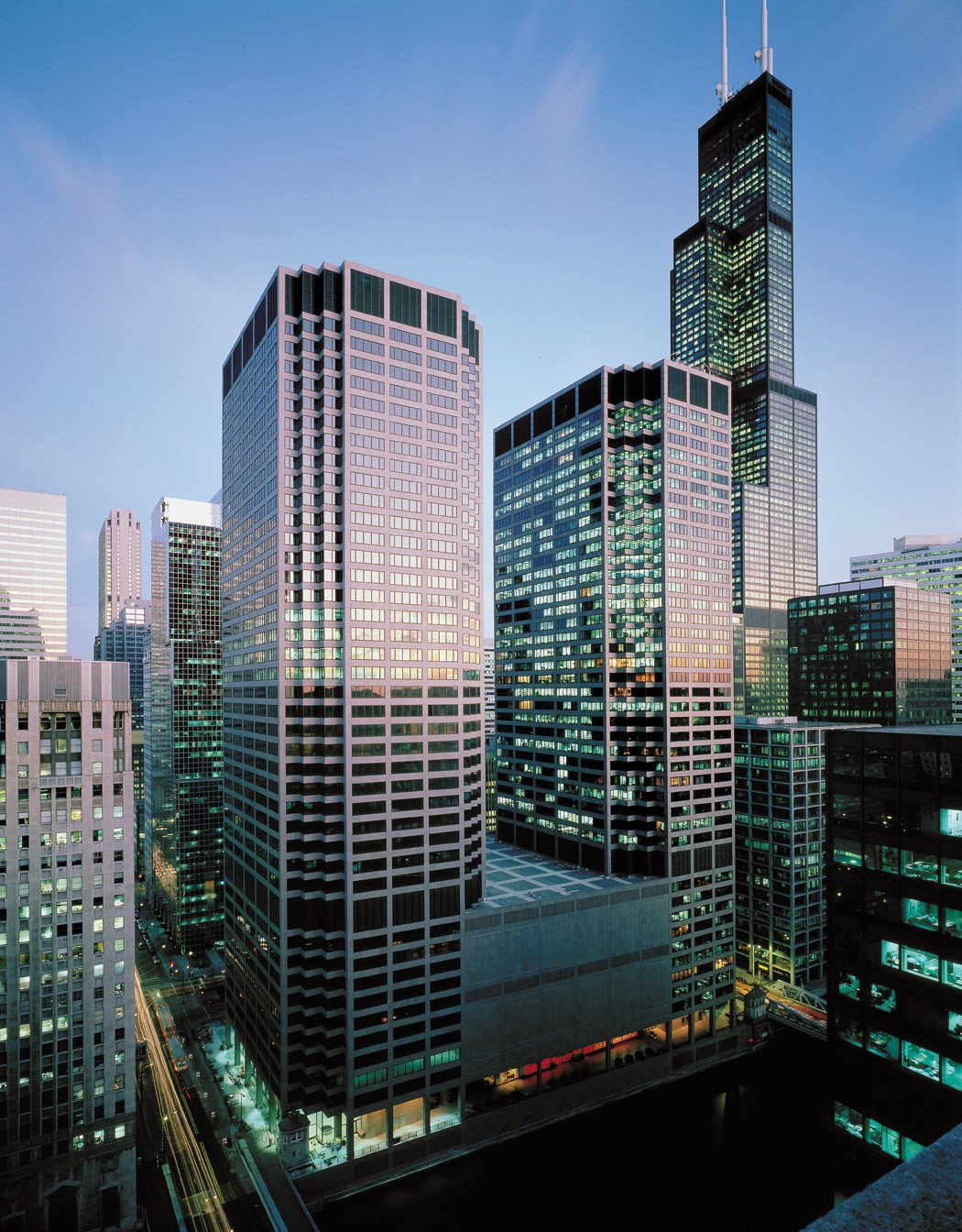
Chicago Mercantile Exchange (CME)

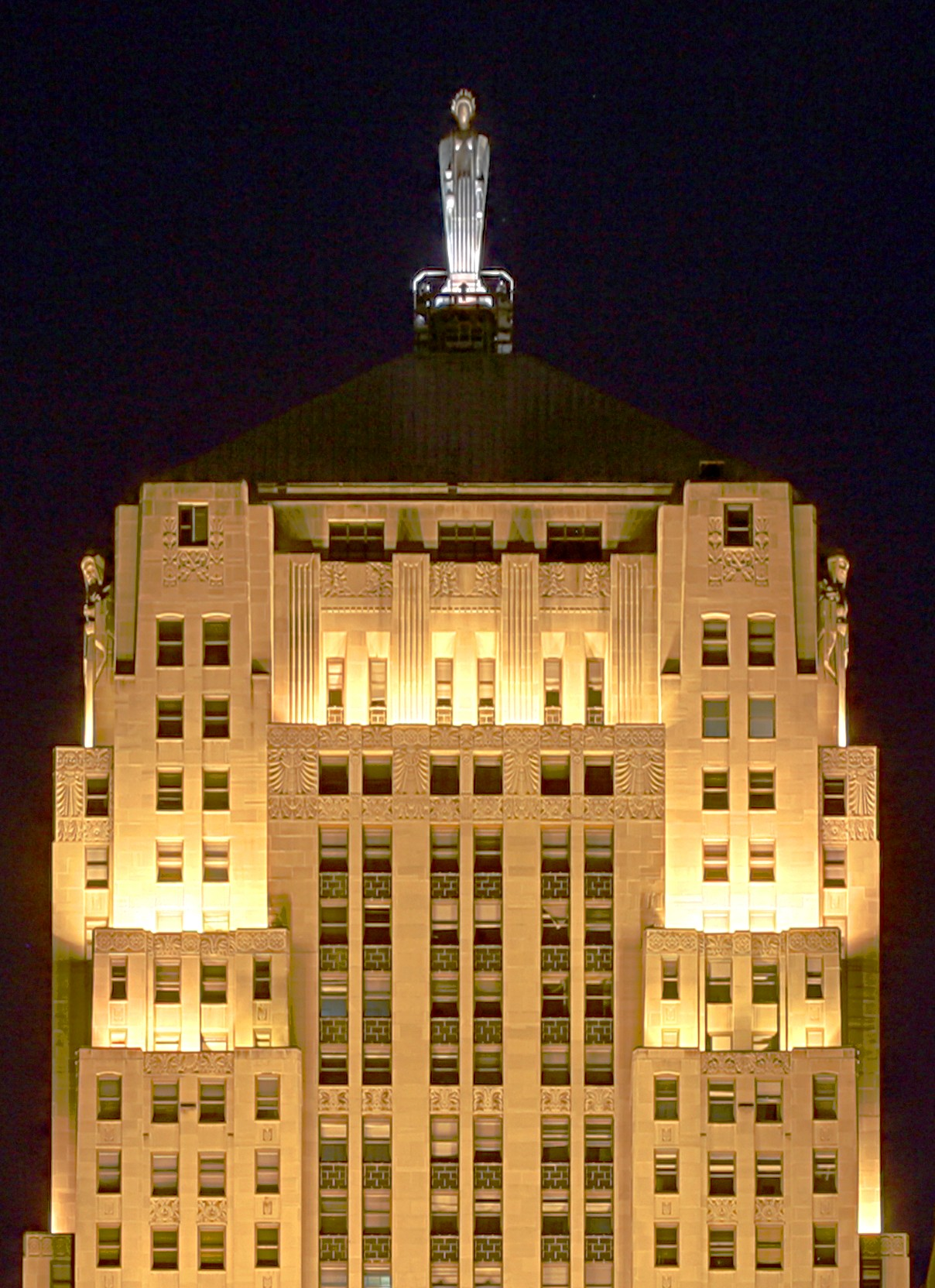
Chicago Board of Trade (CBOT)

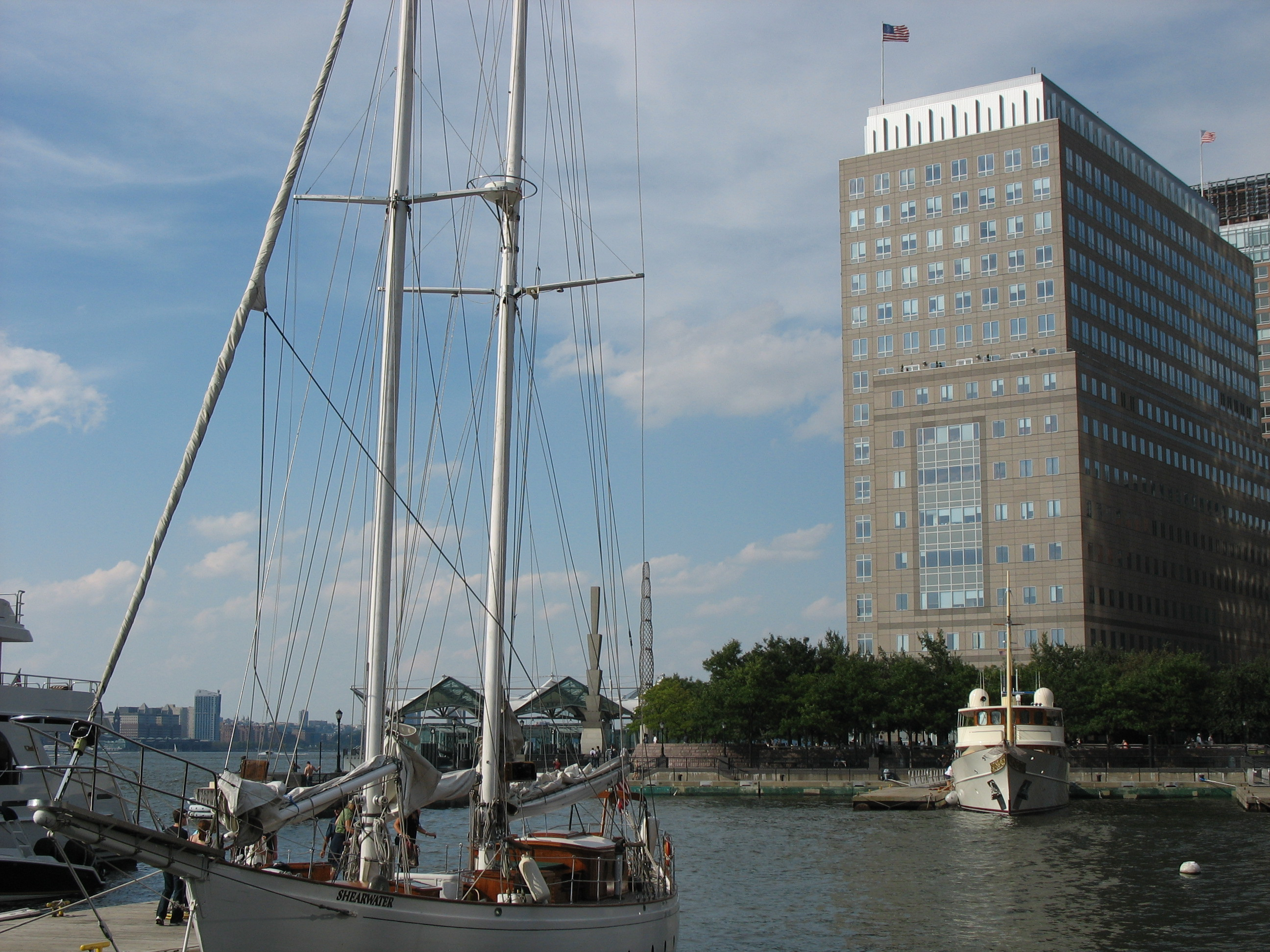
New York Mercantile Exchange (NYMEX) and COMEX

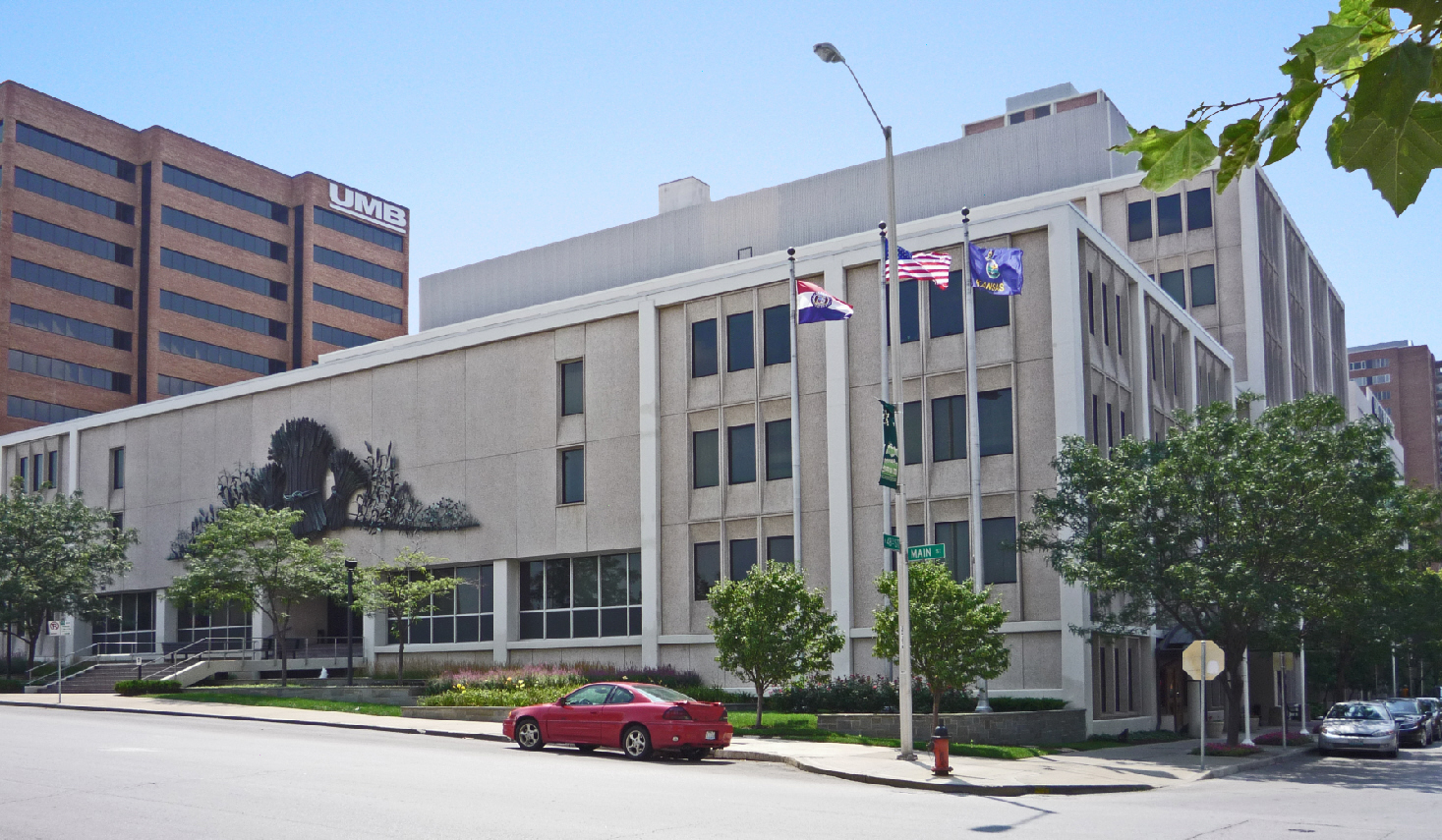
Kansas City Board of Trade (KCBOT)

== Sponsorships ==
The company is the title sponsor of the CME Group Tour Championship, the season-ending tournament of the LPGA tour of women's golf.
