= NEX Group =

UK financial services firm

NEX Group plc
- Company type: Subsidiary
- Industry: Financial services
- Founded: 1999; 27 years ago
- Founder: Michael Spencer
- Headquarters: London, United Kingdom
- Key people: Charles Gregson, Non-Executive Chairman; Michael Spencer, Group CEO
- Services: Inter-broker dealer, trade matching, settlement (financial)
- Revenue: £543 million (2017)
- Operating income: £145 million (2017)
- Net income: £120 million (2017)
- Number of employees: 1,941 (2017)
- Parent: CME Group
- Website: www.nex.com

NEX Group plc, formerly known as ICAP plc, is a UK-based business focused on electronic financial markets and post trade business for other financial institutions rather than private individuals. It is known as an inter-broker dealer. The company operates BrokerTec and EBS, respectively among the largest treasuries and foreign exchange markets in the world. NEX was listed on the London Stock Exchange until it was acquired by CME Group in November 2018.

== History ==
The company developed from a merger between Garban plc and Intercapital plc which created Garban-Intercapital plc in 1999. Intercapital plc was founded by Michael Spencer in 1986 as Intercapital Private Group Limited ('IPGL'); in 1998 it was acquired by Exco plc in a reverse takeover and the enlarged business was renamed Intercapital plc. Garban plc was established in the 1970s as the financial services division of MAI plc. Several takeovers followed, starting in 1977 when MAI plc acquired Harlow, Meyer and Co. Mallon & Dorney and Garvin GuyButler were acquired by 1982 and in 1983, Garban LLC was acquired giving MAI plc significant broking interests in the UK and overseas. In 1996, MAI plc was merged into United News & Media plc: its financial services division was then de-merged and listed on the London Stock Exchange in 1998 as Garban plc.

The company changed its name from Garban-Intercapital plc to ICAP plc in 2001. In 2006 it bought EBS, a major trading platform for foreign exchange. On 5 December 2007, ICAP acquired Traiana, Inc. for $247 million (£121 million). Traiana is a provider of post-trade processing, client servicing, and trading software for financial institutions.

In June 2012 ICAP acquired Plus Stock Exchange plc and relaunched it as the ICAP Securities and Derivatives Exchange (ISDX), one of only six Regulated Investment Exchanges (RIE) in the United Kingdom, the others being the London Stock Exchange (LSE), the London International Financial Futures and Options Exchange (LIFFE), the London Metal Exchange (LME), the Intercontinental Exchange (ICE) and BATS Chi-X Europe. In September 2013, ICAP settled allegations that they had manipulated the London Interbank Offered Rate (LIBOR). The United States Department of Justice charged three former employees, and ICAP paid $65 million to the U.S.'s Commodity Futures Trading Commission and £14 million ($22 million) to Britain's Financial Conduct Authority.

The former ICAP logo.

In October 2014, ICAP's in-house legal team was awarded the Legal 500 2014 UK In-House Team Winner in the Litigation category. In November 2015, ICAP agreed terms for the disposal of its global hybrid voice broking and information business to Tullett Prebon. The company changed its name from ICAP plc to NEX Group plc in December 2016.

In March 2018, it was announced that NEX Group would be bought by American CME Group for US$5.5 billion. The acquisition was completed on 2 November 2018.

== See also ==
- CME Group
- Electronic Broking Services
