= Inter-dealer broker =

Financial intermediary

An Inter-dealer broker (IDB) is specialist financial intermediary that facilitates transactions between broker-dealers, dealer banks and other financial institutions rather than private individuals.

IDBs act as intermediaries in the financial markets working to facilitate transactions between broker/dealers and dealer banks in markets where there is no centralised exchange or market maker such as in the bond market.

== Fixed income securities ==
In the fixed income markets, IDBs are specialized securities companies serving as intermediaries which facilitate transactions between broker/dealers and dealer banks in the debt markets.

Broker/dealers and other financial institutions utilize the secondary fixed income markets to execute their customers’ orders, trade for a profit and manage their exposure to risk, including credit, interest rate and exchange rate risks. There is no centralized exchange in the fixed income market. As a result, financial institutions need a way to find information, liquidity and anonymity for their trading activity. This need created a demand for the services of perhaps the least known and understood market participants, IDBs.

IDBs in the secondary government, agencies, corporate and other debt markets, also known as “municipal securities broker’s brokers” in the municipal bond markets, are specialized securities companies who act as intermediaries working to facilitate transactions between broker/dealers and dealer banks in these markets. IDBs are sometimes described as providing a “Petri dish” of liquidity in the bond markets. That is, they provide a “nurturing environment” wherein market participants can ascertain information about a given market, thereby eventually facilitating a trade between buyers and sellers.

The IDB community distributes information and facilitates transactions in the secondary, or wholesale, financial debt markets between dealers and dealer banks around the world. Typically, markets which make extensive use of IDBs include the corporate bond, fixed income derivatives, U.S. Government and Agency, municipal securities and emerging markets.

Inter-dealer brokers play varying roles in each of the fixed income markets and have become instrumental to their effectiveness and efficiency. IDBs draw together buyers and sellers so that trades can be executed by market participants. IDBs provide potential buyers and sellers with the critical market information they need to trade.

Inter-dealer brokers allow;

- Enhancing price discovery and transparency via communicating dealer interests and transactions
- Providing anonymity and confidentiality via their position in the “middle” of trades
- Facilitating information flow via acting as a central information point
- Facilitating enhanced liquidity via their broad range of contacts
- Improving market efficiency via their rapid access to liquidity
- Lowering costs via their provision of prices to traders without incurring staffing costs
- Faster processing of trades via new technologies
