= TP ICAP =

UK financial services firm

TP ICAP Group plc
- Type: Public
- Traded as: LSE: TCAP; FTSE 250 component
- ISIN: GB00B1H0DZ51
- Industry: Banking
- Founded: 1971
- Founder: Derek Tullett
- Headquarters: London, England, UK
- Key people: Richard Berliand (Chairman); Nicolas Breteau (CEO)
- Revenue: ▲£2,353 million (2025)
- Operating income: ▲£264 million (2025)
- Net income: ▲£189 million (2025)
- Website: tpicap.com/tpicap/

TP ICAP Group plc is a financial services firm headquartered in London, United Kingdom. Its stock is listed on the London Stock Exchange and is a constituent of the FTSE 250 Index.

== History ==
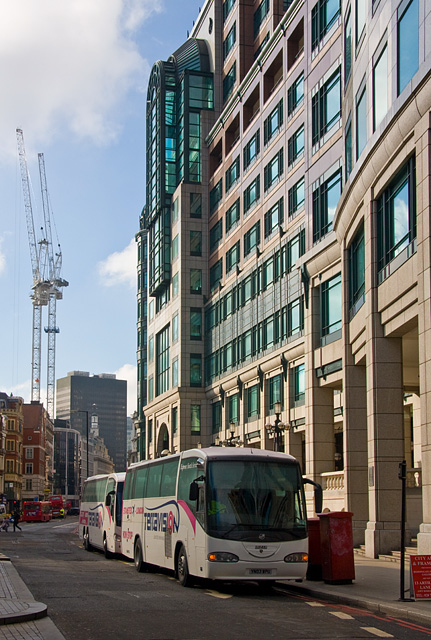
Tullett Prebon's offices in Bishopsgate

The company was founded by Derek Tullett in 1971 as a foreign exchange broker trading as Tullett & Riley. During the 1970s and 1980s, it opened a number of overseas offices and started its own computer graphical analysis company of financial futures, options and FX rates (Futrend Ltd). In 1999 the Company merged with Liberty Brokerage to create Tullett Liberty.

In early 2003, the company was bought by Collins Stewart plc, a financial services company, creating Collins Stewart Tullett plc. In October 2004, the company acquired Prebon Yamane, a broking business formed in 1990 following the merger of three leading London-based money broking businesses (Babcock & Brown, Kirkland-Whittaker and Fulton Prebon) and had adopted that name in acknowledgement of the firm's close business alliance with the Tokyo-based Yamane Group. In December 2006, the group separated into two separate entities: Collins Stewart (stockbroking) and Tullett Prebon (moneybroking). The company acquired Chapdelaine, a US broker, in January 2007 and integrated the business into its existing operations.

In September 2012, the company was asked to help the Financial Services Authority's investigation into malpractice across the City of London, with particular interest in the LIBOR interest rate fixing. In 2014, Terry Smith, chief executive of Tullett Prebon PLC, left the London-based brokerage firm to work full-time at the privately owned asset-management firm that he started in 2010. He was succeeded by John Phizackerley in September 2014. Phizackerley, who preferred to be called "Phiz", started out as a mining engineer with Anglo American and was a former Lehman Brothers and then Nomura executive. In November 2015, the company agreed to terms with ICAP (now known as NEX Group) to acquire their global hybrid voice broking and information business. Using the name of the acquired business the company changed its name from Tullett Prebon plc to TP ICAP plc on 30 December 2016. On 10 July 2018, Nicolas Breteau was appointed as group chief executive officer of TP ICAP.

On 24 March 2021, TP ICAP announced the completion of its acquisition of Liquidnet.

In March 2022, the Financial Times reported that an activist investor and hedge fund, Phase 2 Partners, was urging the board to find a buyer for the company in order to unlock shareholder value.

== Operations ==
- Tullett Prebon: The company operates as an intermediary in wholesale financial markets. Many of its clients are commercial and investment banks. It operates in eight product areas: Volatility, Rates, Credit, Treasury, Non Banking, Energy, Equities and Property. The company also has specialist trading desks including, for example, Insurance Linked Securities where it facilitates Catastrophe Bond secondary market trading and provides a broking service to arrange Primary and Private Market transactions. It also provides data information services for financial institutions, covering areas such as Solvency II risk data, Credit Default Swaps data and FX Options data.
- ICAP: The company trades in a number of areas, including interest rates, credit, credit derivatives, foreign exchange, interest rate swaps, intellectual property (patents, via ICAP Patent Brokerage), and equity derivatives. It operates from London, New York and Tokyo with offices in a further 30 smaller financial centres such as Hong Kong, Madrid, Sydney and Singapore. The average daily transaction volume exceeds US$1.5 trillion. It also operates an ICAP Relative Value (ICRV) desk, specialising in complex, multi-leg synthetic strategies, primarily in US Treasures and Futures markets around the clock.
- PVM Oil: This company covers over the counter broking of swaps, forwards and physical crude oil and refined products together with exchange broking of WTI, Brent and Gasoil futures contracts.
- COEX Partners: Offers trade advisory and execution services in listed derivatives, fixed income, IRS markets and OTC foreign exchange.
- Parameta Solutions: The group’s data and analytics division, providing over‑the‑counter (OTC) market data, indices and analytics sourced from TP ICAP’s brokerage brands (including ICAP, Tullett Prebon and PVM), covering asset classes such as interest rate derivatives, money markets, foreign exchange, and energy and commodities.
