= Interactive Brokers =

American financial services firm

Interactive Brokers Group, Inc.

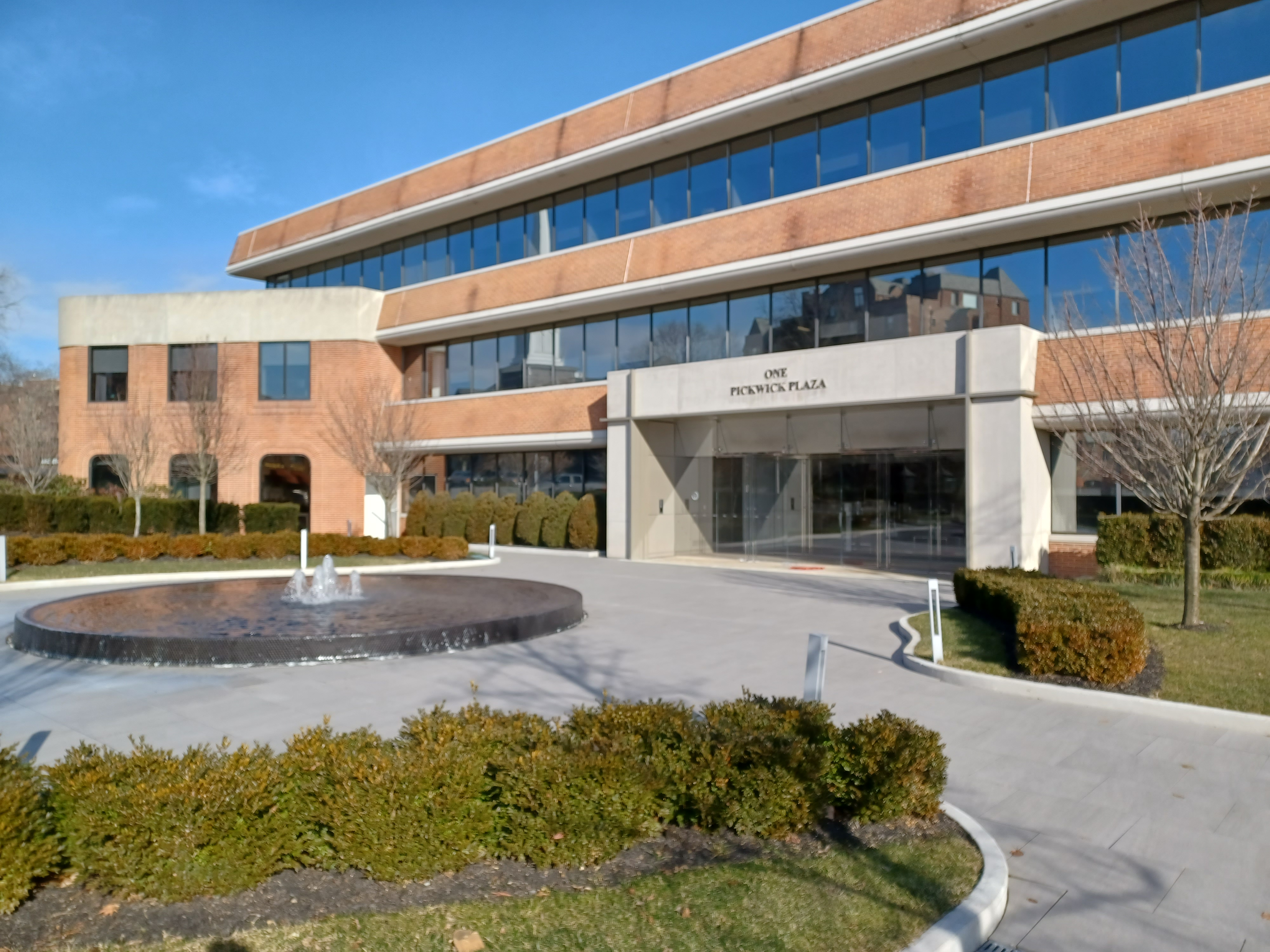
- Headquarters at One Pickwick Plaza
- Type: Public
- Traded as: Nasdaq: IBKR; S&P 500 component
- Industry: Financial services
- Founded: 1978; 48 years ago, in New York City, U.S.
- Founder: Thomas Peterffy
- Headquarters: Greenwich, Connecticut, U.S.
- Number of locations: 24 cities in 16 countries (2025)
- Area served: Worldwide
- Key people: Thomas Peterffy (chairman); Milan Galik (President & CEO)
- Products: Stocks, options, futures, foreign exchange, bonds, funds, precious metals, cryptocurrency, contracts for difference, and forecast contracts
- Services: Online brokerage, direct-access trading, clearing, prime brokerage
- Revenue: ▲US$6.205 billion (2025)
- Net income: ▲US$984 million (2025, attributable to common stockholders)
- Total assets: ▲US$203.240 billion (2025)
- Total equity: ▲US$5.363 billion (2025)
- Number of employees: 3,182 (2025)
- Website: interactivebrokers.com

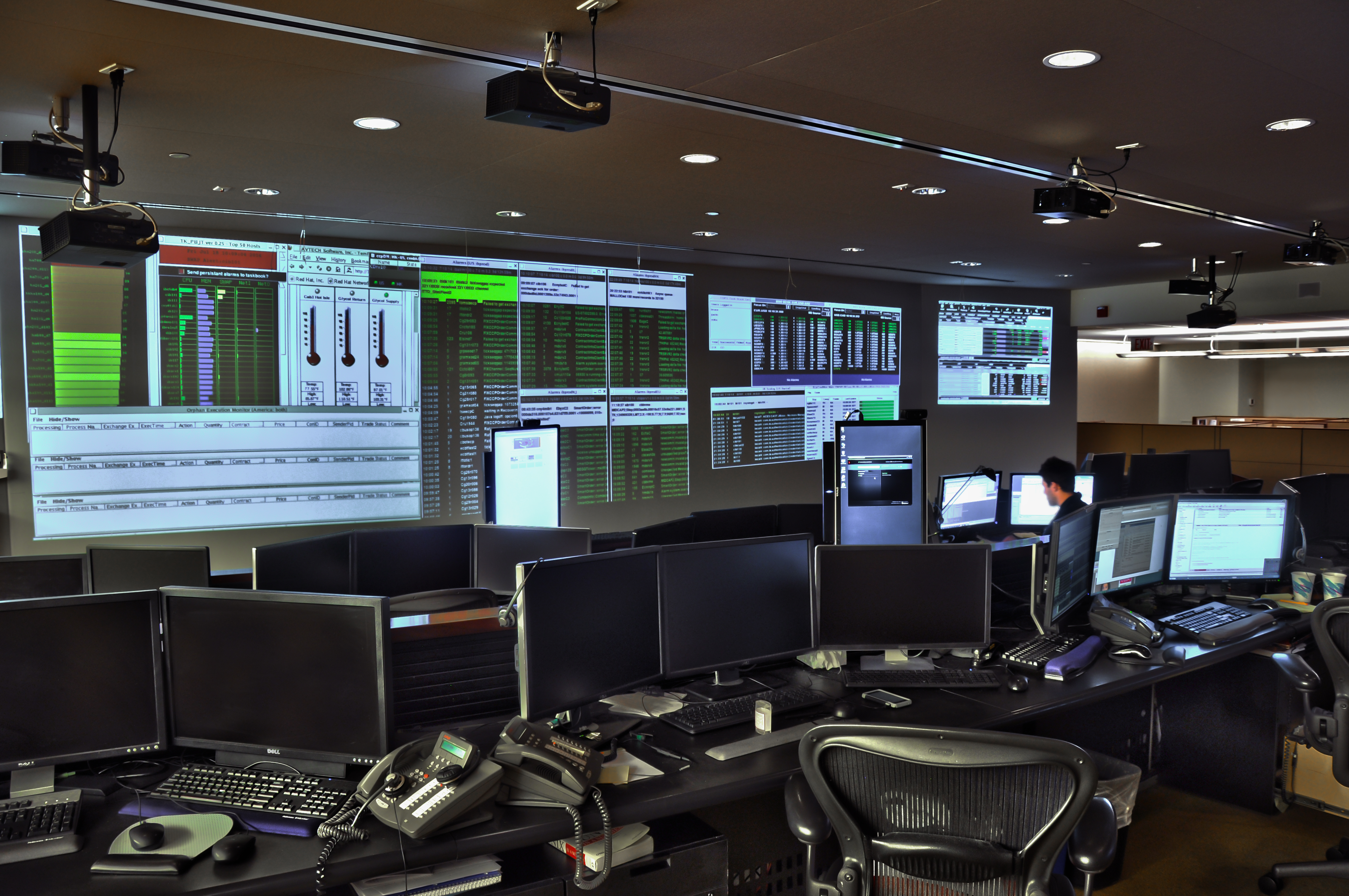
IB Technical Operations

Interactive Brokers Group, Inc. (commonly known as Interactive Brokers or IBKR) is an American multinational brokerage and financial services company headquartered in Greenwich, Connecticut. Through its subsidiaries, it provides automated trade execution and custody services for stocks, options, futures, foreign exchange, bonds, funds and other products on electronic markets worldwide. Its services include direct market access, clearing, securities lending, margin lending and prime brokerage.

As of June 30, 2026, the company had 5.185 million customer accounts and $930.3 billion in customer equity; customer daily average revenue trades (DARTs) averaged 4.824 million during the second quarter of 2026. It provides access to more than 170 markets and serves customers in more than 200 countries and territories.

The company is chaired by its founder, Thomas Peterffy, and has been led by chief executive Milan Galik since 2019. Interactive Brokers ranked 410th on the 2026 Fortune 500. In August 2025, it joined the S&P 500.

The company traces its roots to T.P. & Co., a market maker founded by Peterffy in 1978 and renamed Timber Hill Inc. in 1982. The business pioneered the use of fair-value pricing sheets, handheld trading computers and automated algorithmic trading. Interactive Brokers was incorporated as a broker-dealer in 1993, and its electronic brokerage operations were separated from Timber Hill's market-making business. The group went public in 2007, sold the Timber Hill business in 2017, introduced cryptocurrency trading in 2021 and launched the ForecastEx prediction market in 2024.

== History ==
Peterffy talking about his handheld computers in a CNBC interview, 2016

In 1977, Thomas Peterffy left his job designing commodity trading software for Mocatta Metals, and bought a seat on the American Stock Exchange (AMEX) as an individual market maker. The following year, he formed his first company, named T.P. & Co., to expand trading activities to several members under badge number 549. At the time, trading used an open outcry system. Peterffy developed algorithms to determine the best prices for options and used them on the trading floor. The firm became the first to use daily printed fair value pricing sheets. In 1979, the company expanded to employ four traders, three of whom were AMEX members. In 1982, Peterffy renamed T.P. & Co. to Timber Hill Inc.; he named it after a road to a favorite retreat, one of his properties on Hutchin Hill Road in Woodstock, New York.

By 1983, Peterffy was sending orders to the floor from his upstairs office; he devised a system to read the data from a Quotron machine by measuring the electric pulses in the wire and decoding them. The data would then be sent through Peterffy's trading algorithms, and then Peterffy would call down the trades. After pressure to become a true market maker and keep constant bids and offers, Peterffy knew that he would need his employees to monitor market movements closely, and that handheld computers would help. At the time, the AMEX didn't permit computers on the trading floor. As a result, Peterffy had an assistant deliver market information from his office in the World Trade Center. In November 1983, he convinced the exchange to allow computer use on the floor.

In 1983, Peterffy sought to computerize the options market, and he first targeted the Chicago Board Options Exchange (CBOE). At the time, brokers still used fair value pricing sheets, which were by then updated once or twice a day. In 1983, Timber Hill created the first handheld computers used for trading. As Peterffy explained in a 2016 interview, the battery-powered units had touch screens for the user to input a stock price and it would produce the recommended option prices, and it also tracked positions and continually repriced options on stocks. However, he immediately encountered opposition from the heads of the exchange. When he first brought a 12-inch-long (30 cm) by 9-inch-wide (23 cm) device to the exchange floor, a committee in the exchange told him it was too big. When he made the device smaller, the committee stated that no analytic devices were allowed to be used on the exchange floor. Effectively blocked from using the CBOE, he sought to use his devices in other exchanges.

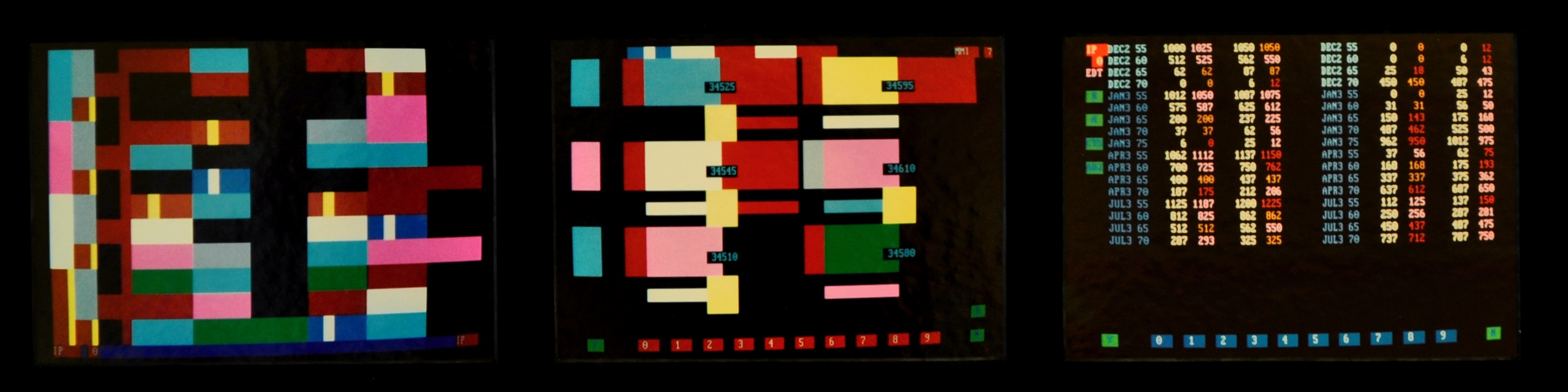
Images of the displays used at the New York Stock Exchange to direct traders

Also in 1983, Timber Hill expanded to 12 employees and began trading on the Philadelphia Stock Exchange. In 1984, Timber Hill began coding a computerized stock index futures and options trading system and, in February 1985, Timber Hill's system and network was brought online. The system was designed to centrally price and manage risk on a portfolio of equity derivatives traded in multiple locations around the country. In 1985, Peterffy introduced his computer system to the New York Stock Exchange (NYSE), which allowed it. However, the stock exchange only allowed it to be used at trading booths several yards away from where transactions were executed. Peterffy responded by designing a code system for his traders to read colored bars emitted in patterns from the video displays of computers in the booths. This led the exchange and other members to suspect insider trading. Timber Hill responded by distributing instructions throughout the exchange, explaining how to read the displays. In response, the exchange required the company to turn the screens away from the trading floor, which prompted Peterffy to hire a clerk to communicate with the traders via hand signals. Eventually computers were allowed on the trading floor.

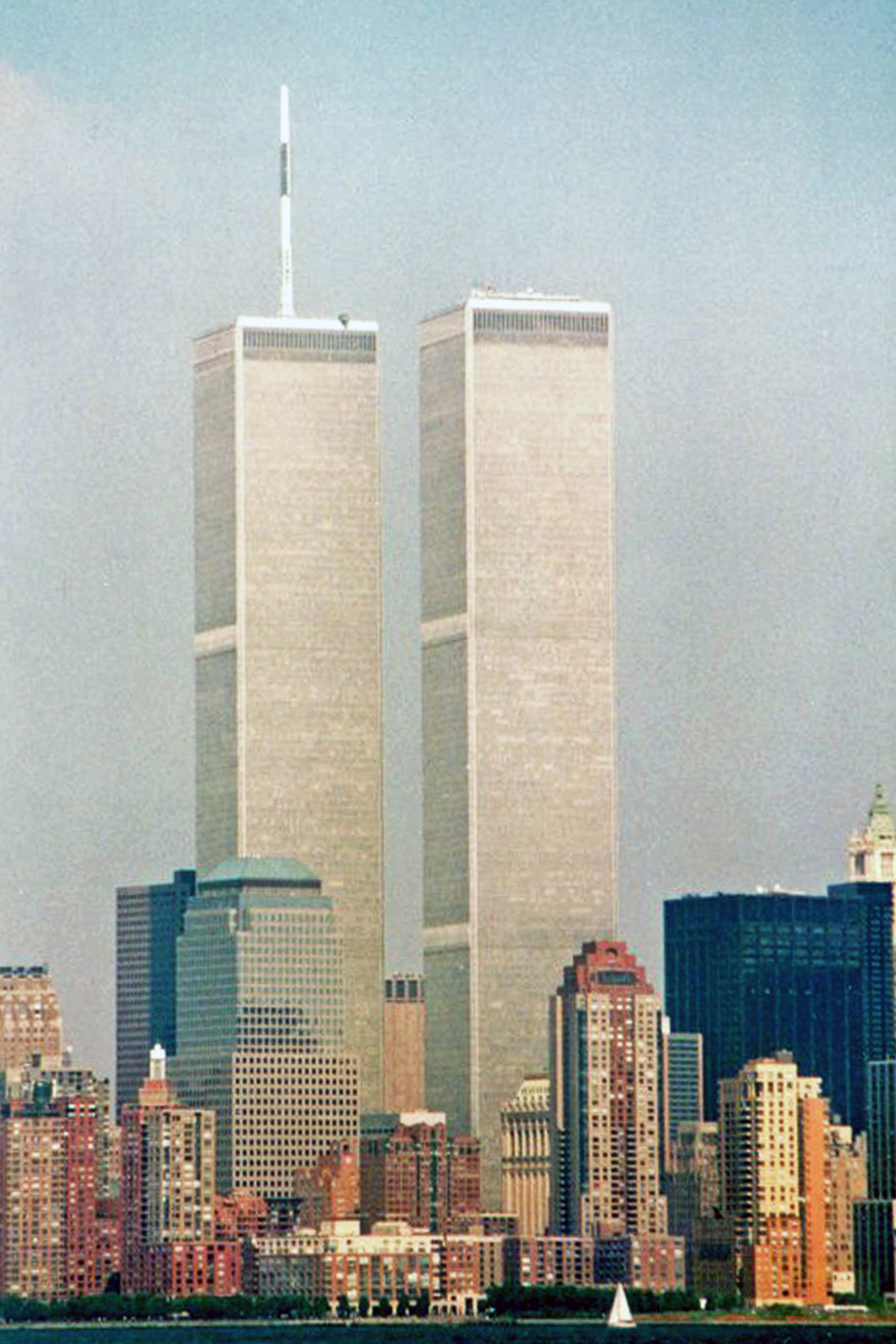
In the 1980s, the company was located in the original World Trade Center.

Timber Hill joined the Options Clearing Corporation in 1984, the New York Futures Exchange in 1985, and the Pacific Stock Exchange and the options division of the NYSE the following year. Also in 1985, the firm joined and began trading on the Chicago Mercantile Exchange, the Chicago Board of Trade and the Chicago Board Options Exchange. In 1986, the company moved its headquarters to the World Trade Center to control activity at multiple exchanges. Peterffy again hired workers to sprint from his offices to the exchanges with updated handheld devices, which he later superseded with phone lines carrying data to computers at the exchanges. Peterffy later built miniature radio transmitters into the handhelds and the exchange computers to allow data to automatically flow to them.

In 1987, Timber Hill joined the National Securities Clearing Corporation and the Depository Trust Company (now merged as the Depository Trust & Clearing Corporation). By 1987, Timber Hill had 67 employees and had become self-clearing in equities. In 1987, the CBOE was about to close down its S&P 500 options market due to the options not attracting sufficient trader interest. In response, Peterffy pledged that Timber Hill would make tight markets in the product for a year if the exchange would allow the traders to use handheld computers on the trading floor. The exchange agreed, and more traders were attracted by the change in pricing. In 1990, Timber Hill Deutschland GmbH was incorporated in Germany, and shortly thereafter began trading equity derivatives at the Deutsche Terminbörse (DTB), marking the first time that Timber Hill used one of its trading systems on a fully automated exchange. In 1992, Timber Hill began trading at the Swiss Options and Financial Futures Exchange, which merged with DTB in 1998 to become Eurex. At that time, Timber Hill had 142 employees.

While Peterffy was trading on the Nasdaq in 1987, he created the first fully automated algorithmic trading system. It consisted of an IBM computer that would pull data from a Nasdaq terminal connected to it and carry out trades on a fully automated basis. The machine, for which Peterffy wrote the software, worked faster than a trader could. Upon inspection, the Nasdaq banned direct interface with the terminal, and required trades to be typed in manually. Peterffy and his team designed a system with a camera to read the terminal, a computer to decode the visual data, and mechanical fingers to type in the trade orders, which was then accepted by the Nasdaq.

=== 1993 to 2000 ===
Interactive Brokers Inc. was incorporated in 1993 as a U.S. broker-dealer, to provide technology developed by Timber Hill for electronic network and trade execution services to customers.

In 1994, Timber Hill Europe began trading at the European Options Exchange, the OM Exchange and the London International Financial Futures and Options Exchange. Also in 1994, Timber Hill Deutschland became a member of the Belgium Futures and Options Exchange, IB became a member of the New York Stock Exchange, and the Timber Hill Group LLC was formed as a holding company of Timber Hill and IB's operations. Timber Hill UK Ltd was incorporated in November 1994.

In 1995, Timber Hill France S.A. was incorporated and began making markets at the Marché des Options Négociables de Paris (a subsidiary of Euronext Paris) and the Marché à Terme International de France futures exchange. Also in 1995, Timber Hill Hong Kong began market making at the Hong Kong Futures Exchange and IB created its primary trading platform Trader Workstation and executed its first trades for public customers.

In 1996, Timber Hill Securities Hong Kong Limited was incorporated and began trading at the Hong Kong Stock Exchange. In the next year, Timber Hill Australia Pty Limited was incorporated in Australia, and Timber Hill Europe began trading in Norway and became a member of the Austrian Derivatives Exchange. By 1997, Timber Hill had 284 employees. In 1998, Timber Hill Canada Company was formed, and IB began to clear online trades for retail customers connected directly to Globex to trade S&P 500 futures.

In 1999, IB introduced a smart order routing linkage for multiple-listed equity options and began to clear trades for its customer stocks and equity derivatives trades. Also in that year, Goldman Sachs attempted to purchase the company and was rejected.

In 2000, Interactive Brokers (U.K.) Limited was formed and Timber Hill became a primary market maker on the International Securities Exchange (ISE).

=== 2001 to 2019 ===
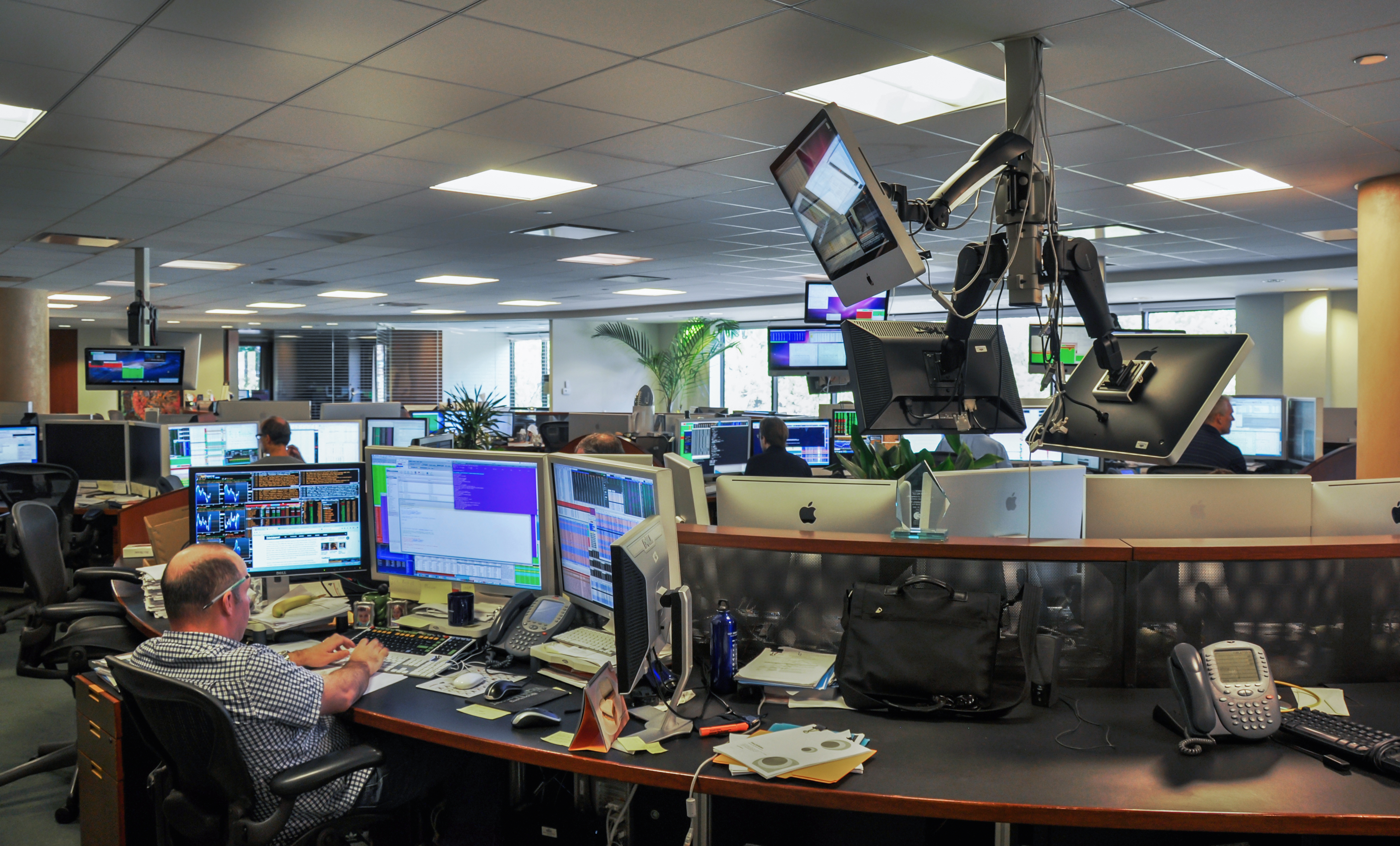
Company trading floor

In 2001, the corporate name of the Timber Hill Group LLC was changed to Interactive Brokers Group LLC, which at the time handled 200,000 trades per day. In 2002, Interactive Brokers, along with the Bourse de Montréal and the Boston Stock Exchange, created the Boston Options Exchange. Also in 2002, the company introduced Mobile Trader and an application programming interface for customers and developers to integrate their mobile phone systems with the IB trading system. Also in 2002, Timber Hill became the major market maker for the newly introduced U.S. single-stock futures.

In 2003, the company expanded its trade execution and clearing services to include Belgian index options and futures, Canadian stocks, equity/index options and futures, Dutch index options and futures, German equity options, Italian index options and futures, Japanese index options and futures, and U.K. equity options. In 2004, the company introduced direct market access to its customers on the Frankfurt Stock Exchange and the Börse Stuttgart. In the same year, IB upgraded its account management system and Trader Workstation, adding real-time data including charts, scanners, fundamental analytics, and tools to the platform.

In 2005, the company launched its forex trading platform IdealPro (now Ideal FX). At that point, Interactive Brokers was one of the largest private securities firms in the United States with $2 billion in capital. It handled 20% of total options volume in the US and 16% worldwide.

In 2006, the IB Options Intelligence Report was launched to report on unusual concentrations of trading interests and changing levels of uncertainty in the option markets. Also that year, IBG took stakes in OneChicago, the ISE Stock Exchange, and the CBOE Stock Exchange. Later in 2006, Interactive Brokers began offering penny-priced options.

On May 3, 2007, the company went public via an initial public offering (IPO) on the Nasdaq, selling 40 million shares, or 10% of the company, at $30.01 per share via a Dutch auction in the largest brokerage IPO since 2005.

In December 2007, the company acquired FutureTrade Technologies, an integrated electronic equity and option trading service provider. In the following year, Interactive Brokers launched Risk Navigator, a real-time market risk management platform. Also in 2008, several trading algorithms were introduced to the Trader Workstation. Among these is the Accumulate-Distribute Algo, which allows traders to divide large orders into small non-uniform increments and release them at random intervals over time to achieve better prices for large volume orders.

In 2009, IB launched a mobile app for iOS. In March of the same year, the company launched brokerage services in India.

In 2011, the company introduced several new services, including the Interactive Brokers Information System, Hedge Fund Capital Introduction Program, and the Stock Yield Enhancement Program. Interactive Brokers also became in 2011 the largest online U.S. broker as measured by daily average revenue trades.

During the Occupy Wall Street protests of 2011–2012, IB ran a series of television commercials with the catchphrase "Join the 1%", which were seen as a controversial criticism of the protests.

In 2012, the company began offering money manager accounts and opened the fully electronic Money Manager Marketplace. IB also released the TWS Mosaic trading interface and the Tax Optimizer for managing capital gains and capital losses.

In 2013, the company released the Probability Lab tool and Traders' Insight, a service that provides daily commentary by Interactive Brokers traders and third-party contributors. Also in 2013, IB integrated its trading notification tool (called IB FYI) into the TWS. The tool keeps customers informed of upcoming announcements that could impact their account, and a customer can set it to automatically act to exercise options early if the action is projected to be beneficial for the customer. An IB FYI also can act to automatically suspend a customer's orders before the announcement of major economic events that influence the market. Between 2007 and 2013, Interactive's brokerage arm revenue and pretax profits grew from $391 million to $814 million, while the market-making arm's profits dropped from $331 million to $72 million.

On April 3, 2014, the company became the first online broker to offer direct access to IEX, a private electronic communication network for trading securities, which was subsequently registered as an exchange.

In May 2015, the company acquired investment management platform Covestor. In the same year, Interactive Brokers launched Investors' Marketplace, which allows customers to find investors and other service providers in the financial industry.

A mobile app for the Apple Watch was released in March 2016.

In October 2017, the company sold its market maker business, Timber Hill, to Two Sigma Investments.

The company's founder Thomas Peterffy stepped down as CEO in 2019, when he turned 75. He retained the position of chairman, while President Milan Galik was appointed CEO.

In September 2019, the company launched commission-free trades via "IBKR Lite". Two months later, the company began offering fractional-share trading.

=== 2020 to present ===
In 2020, the company reported reaching a customer base of one million users. In December 2020, IB acquired the retail operations of Folio Investments, including 70,000 accounts, from Goldman Sachs. In January 2021, Interactive Brokers was among brokerages that restricted trading in certain highly volatile stocks, including GameStop and BlackBerry, during a social media-driven trading frenzy.

In May 2021, IB launched trading in spot gold for U.S. clients. In September 2021, the company introduced trading in cryptocurrencies, including Bitcoin and Ethereum. In May 2024, the platform was expanded to clients in the United Kingdom.

In July 2023, the company launched trading on the Taiwan Stock Exchange. A month later, IB launched fractional share trading in Canadian securities.

In August 2024, the company added access to Bursa Malaysia. That month, its subsidiary ForecastEx began operating a regulated market for event contracts. In October, Interactive Brokers began offering forecast contracts on political outcomes, including the 2024 United States presidential election. In 2025, IB launched forecast contracts in Canada.

In July 2025, Interactive Brokers founder Thomas Peterffy said the company was considering a stablecoin and working on 24/7 stablecoin funding for brokerage accounts and transfers of commonly traded cryptocurrencies. In December 2025, the company connected its platform to the Abu Dhabi Securities Exchange (ADX) and Dubai Financial Market (DFM), expanding access to UAE equities. Later that month, it began allowing some eligible U.S. retail customers to fund brokerage accounts with stablecoins.

In January 2026, Interactive Brokers expanded 24/7 account funding using USDC, with deposits converted into U.S. dollars through Zerohash. In May 2026, it added access to equities listed on the Korea Exchange and launched a platform for prediction-market contracts listed on Kalshi, CME Group and ForecastEx.

In June 2026, the company connected brokerage accounts to Anthropic's Claude, allowing clients to research securities, analyze portfolios and generate trade instructions for review and approval. Later that month it added connections to ChatGPT and Grok, and in July expanded the service to other tools supporting the Model Context Protocol.

== Financials ==
Interactive Brokers' total net revenues increased from $4.340 billion in 2023 to $5.185 billion in 2024 and $6.205 billion in 2025. Net income available to common stockholders was $600 million in 2023, $755 million in 2024 and $984 million in 2025. Total net interest income rose from $2.794 billion in 2023 to $3.148 billion in 2024 and $3.563 billion in 2025.

Customer accounts grew from 2.562 million at year-end 2023 to 3.337 million at year-end 2024 and 4.399 million at year-end 2025. Customer equity increased from $426.0 billion to $568.2 billion and $779.9 billion over the same period.

For the second quarter of 2026, net revenues were $1.896 billion and net income available to common stockholders was $312 million, compared with $1.480 billion and $224 million in the prior-year quarter.

Interactive Brokers Group, Inc. is a publicly traded company listed on Nasdaq under the ticker symbol IBKR. Despite its public status, the company remains controlled by its founder and chairman, Thomas Peterffy. As of June 30, 2026, the public company held 26.5% of the membership interests in IBG LLC, while IBG Holdings LLC held the remaining 73.5%, which was reported as a noncontrolling interest. IBG Holdings owns all outstanding Class B common stock and is controlled by Peterffy through his ownership of its voting membership interests. As of February 24, 2026, the Class B shares represented approximately 73.7% of the company's voting power.

== Lawsuits and fines ==
=== Sanctions violations ===
On 15 July 2025, the U.S. Department of the Treasury's Office of Foreign Assets Control (OFAC) announced a $11.8 million settlement with Interactive Brokers for apparent violations of several sanctions programs. According to the agency, the company provided brokerage and investment services to persons located in Iran, Cuba, Syria and the Crimea region. It also processed transactions involving securities and persons subject to sanctions under the Chinese Military-Industrial Complex, Russia, Global Magnitsky, Venezuela and Syria programs. OFAC attributed the violations to deficiencies in the firm's compliance systems.

=== Operational and trading failures ===
In January 2015, following the Swiss National Bank's removal of its minimum exchange rate against the euro, Interactive Brokers said some customers incurred losses in excess of their deposits and that client deficits it might have to cover were about $120 million.

On 20 April 2020, West Texas Intermediate futures for May delivery traded at negative prices. Many Interactive Brokers clients incurred losses exceeding the equity available in their accounts. Following an investigation, in September 2021 the Commodity Futures Trading Commission (CFTC) ordered the company to pay a $1.75 million civil penalty and $82.57 million in customer restitution. The regulator found that Interactive Brokers had received prior warnings about the risk of negative pricing but had not adequately configured its electronic trading and margin systems.

In June 2024, Interactive Brokers disclosed a $48 million loss from a malfunction at the New York Stock Exchange that briefly displayed a 99% fall in the prices of several stocks, including Berkshire Hathaway Class A shares. Customers bought shares after the displayed plunge, and the broker said the NYSE denied its claims for compensation.

=== Regulatory fines and oversight ===
==== United States ====
In August 2018, Interactive Brokers was fined $5.5 million for violating federal regulations on naked short selling. According to the Financial Industry Regulatory Authority (FINRA), the firm failed to properly supervise such activity between July 2012 and June 2015, despite internally identifying the issue.

In August 2020, Interactive Brokers agreed to pay $38 million in penalties to FINRA, the U.S. Securities and Exchange Commission (SEC) and the CFTC over anti-money-laundering, supervision and recordkeeping failures. FINRA imposed a $15 million fine, while the SEC and CFTC each imposed $11.5 million penalties; the CFTC also ordered $706,214 in disgorgement.

In September 2023, Interactive Brokers agreed to pay $55 million to the SEC and CFTC over recordkeeping and supervision failures related to employees' use of unapproved communication channels, including personal text messages and WhatsApp. The SEC imposed a $35 million penalty and the CFTC imposed a concurrent $20 million penalty.

In April 2024, Nasdaq fined the firm $475,000 for improperly handling five corporate actions between January 2020 and June 2021. The enforcement report cited supervisory and systems failures, including cases in which clients were able to sell shares they did not own.

In October 2024, FINRA fined Interactive Brokers $475,000 for violations of the Customer Protection Rule between June and December 2021. FINRA found more than 800 instances in which the firm miscalculated the number of excess shares of European-listed stocks available for return to customers, and found that an unregistered individual had authority over adjustments to its securities-lending algorithm.

In December 2024, FINRA fined Interactive Brokers $2.25 million for failing to detect more than 4.2 million instances of free riding in customer cash accounts between October 2015 and December 2022.

In April 2025, FINRA fined the firm $400,000 for failures to accurately report required statistical summaries of written customer complaints from January 2020 to June 2022 and to disclose 91 regulatory or civil enforcement actions dating from July 2011 to September 2022. In August 2025, FINRA censured and fined Interactive Brokers $650,000 for failures in its options-account approval process for certain self-directed customers.

In October 2025, FINRA censured Interactive Brokers and fined the firm $150,000 for violating Rule 603(c) of Regulation NMS by failing to provide certain customers with a consolidated display containing required market data. In December 2025, Nasdaq censured Interactive Brokers and fined it $900,000, finding that from April 2021 through August 2023 its supervisory system was not reasonably designed to prevent potentially manipulative trading through certain foreign omnibus accounts.

==== United Kingdom ====
In January 2018, the Financial Conduct Authority (FCA) fined Interactive Brokers £1,049,412 for deficiencies in its market-abuse surveillance systems. The FCA found that between February 2014 and February 2015, the company failed to adequately detect and report potentially suspicious trading activity.

==== Australia ====
In September 2023, Interactive Brokers Australia paid an A$832,500 penalty after the Australian Securities and Investments Commission's Market Disciplinary Panel found that it had been negligent in failing to identify suspicious orders placed by a client and reckless in allowing the client to continue trading after ASIC raised concerns. The matter involved closing-auction orders in Orthocell shares on the Australian Securities Exchange. Payment of the penalty was not an admission of guilt or liability.

==== Hong Kong ====
In April 2025, the Securities and Futures Commission (SFC) fined Interactive Brokers' Hong Kong subsidiary HK$4.2 million for lending securities belonging to 7,911 clients without valid authorization between December 2017 and October 2020. The securities had an estimated market value of more than HK$586 billion. The regulator described the breach as a serious failure in the firm's internal controls and compliance processes and noticed the firm had self-reported the matter and that there was no evidence that clients suffered financial losses.

=== Frauds and lawsuits ===
==== Ponzi schemes ====
In 2021, Interactive Brokers was sued by Benjamin Chang, a victim of Haena Park's Ponzi scheme, accusing IB of aiding and abetting Park in her fraud. Through her IB account, Park had lost more than $19 million of investors' money. Beginning in 2012, Park had repeatedly funded the account and then lost on high-risk trades in amounts far in excess of her net worth and the earnings data she provided. IB's compliance department reported her account's activity as suspicious at least 12 times, but IB supervisors allegedly ignored the reports, including reports involving multiple deceptively named accounts. When a compliance analyst reported her account in 2015, IB compliance officers overrode the Customer Account Supervision System to allow Park to continue trading. Park was arrested in June 2016 and sentenced in 2017 to three years in prison. The lawsuit against Interactive Brokers was dismissed by a federal magistrate judge on 25 April 2022 for failure to state a claim.

In a lawsuit filed in New York Southern District Court, David A. Castleman, the court-appointed receiver for EminiFX, accused Interactive Brokers of negligence and aiding a breach of fiduciary duty. Castleman alleged that EminiFX founder Eddy Alexandre transferred more than $9 million of investor funds into his personal Interactive Brokers account and lost more than $7 million through high-risk trading. Interactive Brokers denied wrongdoing and said that Alexandre had concealed his fraud. Interactive Brokers removed the action to federal court, but in April 2025 the court ruled that it lacked subject-matter jurisdiction and remanded it to state court. In December 2025, the state court dismissed the complaint with prejudice under the doctrine of in pari delicto. Castleman appealed, and the appeal was calendared for argument before the Appellate Division on 27 May 2026.

==== Client fraud and oversight failures ====
The New Jersey Division of Consumer Affairs and the Bureau of Securities determined that Interactive Brokers had allowed Peter Zuck, a three-time convicted financial felon, to open and operate accounts on its platform despite being permanently barred by the National Futures Association (NFA). Zuck was permitted to open at least 16 accounts, including two master accounts in his own name and eleven sub-accounts in the names of other individuals that were linked to the same master account. Zuck lured investors into his Osiris Fund Limited Partnership and used the IB platform to defraud them of more than $7.5 million. The Bureau said that IB failed to conduct an NFA BASIC search during the account-opening process. On February 11 2019, the Bureau announced that IB had agreed to pay a $100,000 civil penalty.

==== Private litigation and negligence ====
In 2015, Robert Scott Batchelar filed a proposed class action alleging that Interactive Brokers and related defendants had negligently designed, coded, tested and maintained the software used to automatically liquidate under-margined customer accounts. A federal district court dismissed his claims in 2016, but in September 2018 the United States Court of Appeals for the Second Circuit reinstated his negligence claims for further consideration. In January 2026, the court preliminarily approved a $5 million proposed settlement covering certain U.S. customers whose margin accounts had been liquidated using the software between December 2013 and July 2025. The defendants denied wrongdoing. The federal docket lists the case as terminated on 17 June 2026.

== See also ==
- Financial innovation
