= Thomas Peterffy =

Hungarian-American businessman (born 1944)

- Thomas Peterffy in 2018
- Born: September 30, 1944 (age 81); Budapest, Hungary
- Citizenship: United States
- Education: New York University (attended)
- Spouse: Dale McDonald (divorced)
- Children: 3

Thomas Peterffy (born September 30, 1944) is a Hungarian-born American billionaire businessman. He is the founder, chairman and the largest shareholder of Interactive Brokers. As of November 2025, his estimated net worth is US$109 billion, making him the 18th richest person in the world.

Peterffy worked as an architectural draftsman after emigrating to the United States, and later became a computer programmer. In 1977, he purchased a seat on the American Stock Exchange and played a role in developing the first electronic trading platform for securities.

Peterffy is a donor to the Republican Party and conservative causes.

== Early life ==
Peterffy was born in Budapest, Hungary, on September 30, 1944, in a hospital basement during a Russian air raid. His father emigrated to the U.S. after the failure of the Hungarian Revolution in 1956. Peterffy left his engineering studies in Hungary and emigrated to the United States to join his father in New York in 1965. When his father, who was living with his second wife, did not have room to accommodate his son, he gave Thomas $100 and told him to "make something of himself". When he moved to New York City, he did not speak English. Shortly after emigrating, Peterffy enrolled at New York University School of Engineering. However, he dropped out before completing his studies to work as an architectural draftsman.

== Career ==
Peterffy began his career in the U.S. as an architectural draftsman working on highway projects for an engineering firm. At this firm, he volunteered to program a newly purchased computer. Of his background in programming, Peterffy said, "I think the way a CEO runs his company is a reflection of his background. Business is a collection of processes, and my job is to automate those processes so that they can be done with the greatest amount of efficiency".

Peterffy left his career designing financial modeling software and bought a seat on the American Stock Exchange to trade equity options. During his career in finance, he has consistently pushed to replace manual processes with more efficient automated ones. He wrote code in his head during the trading day and then applied his ideas to computerized trading models after hours. Peterffy created a stir among traders by introducing handheld computers onto the trading floor in the early 1980s. His business related to his AMEX seat eventually developed into Interactive Brokers. He stepped down as chief executive in 2019.

In 2021, Interactive Brokers moved its European headquarters in London and outsourced its operations to two new continental centers. Thereafter, their Western European clients were served by a subsidiary in Ireland, while their Central European operations were based in Budapest. According to Peterffy, he chose Budapest because he was convinced that the Hungarian language and the “unique Hungarian logic” would result in above-average profitability; he also wanted to pay off the debt he owed to his native Hungary. The Budapest-based subsidiary, Interactive Brokers Central Europe Zrt., was established in Hungary and became a member of the Budapest Stock Exchange (BSE) upon its incorporation.

Peterffy, alongside Mark Penn, Victor Ganzi, Josh Harris, and James Tisch, contributed to a $50 million investment fund in The Messenger, a news website that launched in May 2023.

== Interactive Brokers ==
Interactive Brokers Group, Inc. (IB) is an online discount brokerage firm in the United States. The company traces its origin to 1977 when Peterffy bought a seat on the American Stock Exchange as an individual market maker and formed T.P. & Co. the following year. IB has many subsidiaries operating on most major stock, futures, bonds, forex, and options exchanges worldwide. The company commenced a public offering on 4 May 2007 under the ticker symbol Nasdaq: IBKR on the Nasdaq exchange. On October 5, 2018, Interactive Brokers moved its listing to IEX, becoming the exchange's founding issuer. Barron's Magazine stated in 2009 that Interactive Brokers maintains a position as "the least expensive trading venue for investors", and continued to be ranked by Barron's as the lowest cost broker as well as the Best Online Broker in 2019.

=== OneChicago ===
OneChicago was an all-electronic exchange owned jointly by IB Exchange Group (IB), Chicago Board Options Exchange (CBOE), and CME Group. It was a privately held company that was regulated by both the Securities and Exchange Commission and the Commodity Futures Trading Commission. The OneChicago corporate headquarters was located in the Chicago Board of Trade Building in Chicago's financial district. OneChicago offered approximately 2,272 single-stock futures (SSF) products with names such as IBM, Apple and Google. All trading was cleared through Options Clearing Corporation (OCC). At the time, OneChicago operated the only U.S. based securities futures marketplace.

== Regulatory influence and political views ==
In 1999, Peterffy was influential in persuading the Securities and Exchange Commission (SEC) that U.S. options markets could be linked electronically, which would ensure that investors receive the best possible options prices. He has also testified before the United States Senate Banking Subcommittee on Securities, Insurance, and Investment about adding banking regulations.

During the 2012 United States presidential campaign, Peterffy created political ads supporting the Republican Party. Peterffy bought millions of dollars of air time on networks such as CNN, CNBC, and Bloomberg. The ads consisted of a minute-long spot narrated by Peterffy, warning against creeping socialism in the United States. The ads were out of the ordinary, because Peterffy was not a candidate and did not buy the ads through a 527 group, but instead paid for them directly.

In the spot, Peterffy said, "America's wealth comes from the efforts of people striving for success. Take away their incentive with badmouthing success and you take away the wealth that helps us take care of the needy. Yes, in socialism the rich will be poorer, but the poor will also be poorer. People will lose interest in really working hard and creating jobs."

Peterffy's ad received mixed responses. Joshua Green, writing for Bloomberg Businessweek, said "The ad, while slightly ridiculous, is deeply sincere and also quite affecting." Green also asked Peterffy whether the comparison between the United States and Hungary made in the ad was a fair one: "[Peterffy] couldn't really think that the U.S. was turning into socialist Hungary, could he? The government isn't suppressing speech and throwing political opponents in jail. No, he conceded, it wasn't. But it sure feels like that's the path we're on." Politico said that it could have been influential in Ohio due to its large Hungarian American population.

Voter registration records in Connecticut show that Peterffy has been registered as an independent voter. He donated over $60,000 to the Republican National Committee in 2011 and $100,000 to a pro-Donald Trump political group during the 2016 United States presidential election.

=== Views on Donald Trump and the Republican Party ===
Discussing the 2016 election in 2021, he said "I am actually not a Trump fan at all. I hope he won't run again." Peterffy also then said that the Republican Party is "completely adrift". Peterffy says he did not vote for Trump in the 2016 Republican Party presidential primaries, but supported Trump's bid for the presidency after Trump became the Republican nominee due to Trump's opposition to socialism and collectivism. Peterffy lives near Mar-a-Lago, Trump's Florida estate, and is a member of the Mar-a-Lago Club.

Peterffy contributed $250,000 to Donald Trump's 2020 presidential campaign.

In late 2023, Peterffy, as well as other wealthy Republican donors, distanced themselves from Trump. Peterffy said in December 2023 that, “the street still hopes for somebody else", and expressed hope for a brokered convention. Peterffy said at that time that he will not donate to support Trump's campaign. In November 2022, Peterffy had said that Trump, "can't get elected" and that, even if as a citizen he would vote for him as the GOP nominee, that he, "will do whatever I can to make sure he is not."

Nevertheless, Peterffy supported Trump in the 2024 election. Peterffy attended a fundraising dinner for Trump on August 10, 2024, in Aspen, Colorado at the home of John and Amy Phelan, in which attendees donated between $25,000 and $500,000 to Trump's campaign. Federal records show that Peterffy donated $500,000 to the Trump 47 Committee, Inc. on August 5, 2024, and likewise $344,660 to the same committee on August 12, 2024. Prior to that point he hadn't donated at all to Trump's campaign while still donating about $7 million to Republican causes and candidates.

On December 11, 2024, in the aftermath of the election, Peterffy sat down for an interview with Bloomberg's Sonali Basak at a Goldman Sachs Group Inc. conference. Basak mentioned at the beginning of the interview that Peterffy had donated to Trump both in 2020 and in 2024, and Peterffy stated that, "having grown up in a socialist country I came to a conviction early on in my life that a free market economy is the only way to efficiently run a society", and, "I've always been a Republican all my life." He said that, "I'm very happy that this is the outcome that we had this election time." However, Peterffy also pointed out that he has donated collectively more to other Republicans than to Trump.

In 2025, Peterffy said, "The wealthiest people are business people, and they are surging to Trump because they understand how much better Trump is for a prosperous economy."

== Personal life ==
He was married to Dale McDonald, and they had three children together, two daughters and a son, William Peterffy. They later divorced.

He is an avid equestrian. He lives in Palm Beach, Florida. He owns a home in Aspen, Colorado. In 2020, he sold his 80-acre Connecticut estate for $21 million after originally listing it for $65 million in 2015.

== Award ==
- Hungarian Order of Merit (2017)
