= Witching =

Witching may refer to:

- The practice of witchcraft
- Dowsing, a practice that attempts to locate objects without the use of scientific apparatus
- The Witching, a comic book series
- Triple witching, an economic concept
- Witching Waves, an amusement ride introduced in 1907

== See also ==
- Witching hour (disambiguation)
