= Leo Melamed =

American businessman (born 1932)

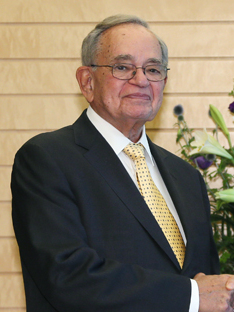
- Melamed at the Prime Minister's Official Residence on July 1, 2014
- Born: March 20, 1932 (age 93); Bialystok, Poland
- Occupation(s): Chairman, Chicago Mercantile Exchange; lawyer; author

Leo Melamed (born March 20, 1932) is an American attorney, finance executive, and a pioneer of financial futures. He is the chairman emeritus of CME Group (formerly the Chicago Mercantile Exchange).

== Personal life ==
Melamed was born Leibel Melamdovich in 1932 in Bialystok, Poland into a Jewish family, to two school teachers, Fayga (Barakin) Melamdovich and Isaac Melamdovich (a mathematics teacher). In 1939, following Germany's invasion of Poland and with the outbreak of World War II, his family fled to Lithuania to avoid capture by the Nazis. In 1940, the Japanese consul general to Lithuania, Chiune Sugihara, issued his family a life-saving transit visa, and they made the long trek across Siberia to safe haven in Tsuruga, Japan. They crossed the Pacific to the United States in the spring of 1941, and the family settled in Chicago.

Melamed married Betty Sattler on December 26, 1953. The couple has three children: Idelle Sharon, Jordan Norman and David Jeffrey.

Melamed is an avid contract bridge competitor and often pairs with his wife, Betty.

Melamed's personal life and his strained relationship with his son are the subjects of the 2012 documentary Futures Past, written and directed by his son, Jordan Melamed.

== Career ==
Melamed received his undergraduate degree from the University of Illinois in 1952 and his law degree from John Marshall Law School in 1955. He became involved in futures trading by accident. While in law school, he was looking for a law clerk job and answered a want ad from a firm looking for a "runner", thinking the firm, Merrill Lynch, Pierce, Fenner & Beane, with that many names could be nothing but an established law firm that would be looking for a clerk to "run" to court. Instead, he worked as a runner in the produce futures markets of the Chicago Mercantile Exchange while in law school and learned about the business. He practiced law until 1965 and was elected to the CME board in 1967.

Melamed became chairman of the Chicago Mercantile Exchange in 1969. In 1972, under his leadership, the CME created the International Monetary Market (IMM), the world's first financial futures exchange, and launched currency futures. In the years that followed, Melamed led the CME and IMM in the creation of a number of financial instruments, including futures on US Treasury bills in 1976, Eurodollars in 1981, and stock index futures in 1982.

In 1987, Melamed spearheaded the creation and introduction of Globex, the world's first electronic trading system, and became its founding chairman.

In 1991, he founded his own consulting firm, Melamed & Associates, of which he is chairman and chief executive officer. He used to be a member of the global markets advisory committee of the U.S. Commodity Futures Trading Commission (CFTC) and has served as a special advisor on futures markets to governments worldwide. Melamed serves on the prestigious Chinese International Advisory Council of Chinese Securities Regulatory Commission (CSRC).

Throughout the next three decades and into the 21st century, Melamed held many CME titles including: Special Counsel to the Board, Chairman of the Executive Committee, and Senior Policy Advisor, but remained the acknowledged leader of the CME. In 2002, he led the CME membership to become the first U.S. financial exchange to go public.

In 2014, he was a board member of CME Group and chairman of its Strategic Steering Committee.

== Recognition and awards ==
Twenty years after their inception, Nobel Laureate in Economics, Merton Miller, named financial futures "the most significant innovation of the past two decades". At the close of 1999, the former editor of the Chicago Tribune named Melamed "among the ten most important Chicagoans in business of the 20th Century".

He was named a Lincoln Laureate in 2016 in the area of Business, Industry & Communications.

== Bibliography ==
Melamed has lectured and written extensively on the markets. His published works include:

- The Tenth Planet (Bonus Books, 1984), (Science fiction)
- Merits of Flexible Exchange Rates: An Anthology, Editor (George Mason University Press, 1988) ASIN: B000M3U0VO
- Leo Melamed on The Markets: Twenty Years of Financial History as Seen by the Man Who Revolutionized the Markets (John Wiley & Sons, 1992), ISBN 0-471-57524-0
- Escape to the Futures, (John Wiley & Sons, 1996), ISBN 0-471-11215-1 prize-winning memoirs which have been published in Chinese, Japanese, Korean and Russian
- For Crying Out Loud, (John Wiley & Sons; 2009), memoirs continuation, translated into Chinese and Japanese
- Man of the Futures: The Story of Leo Melamed and the Birth of Modern Finance (Harriman House Ltd, 2021), ISBN 978-0857197481

== Honors ==
- Order of the Rising Sun, 2nd Class, Gold and Silver Star (2017)
- Inducted as a Laureate of The Lincoln Academy of Illinois and awarded the Order of Lincoln (the State’s highest honor) by the Governor of Illinois in 2016 in the area of Business, Industry, & Communication.
