= Howard Shore (entrepreneur) =

British entrepreneur

- Born: Howard Paul Shore; April 1960 (age 65–66)
- Education: University of Cambridge
- Occupation: Entrepreneur
- Known for: Founder of Shore Capital Group

Howard Paul Shore (born April 1960) founded and remains chairman of Shore Capital Group Limited, an investment group based in Guernsey, with offices in the UK and Europe. He later founded Puma Brandenburg Limited, a family owned investment vehicle focused on real estate and other asset classes and is a prominent supporter of the UK Conservative Party.

== Career ==
Howard Shore began his career at private client fund manager Grieveson Grant & Co before studying economics at Cambridge University. On graduating, he returned to the City and traded financial futures on the newly established LIFFE market.

In 1985, aged 25, he co-founded Shore Capital, (then known as Puma Securities) as an independent stockbroker with an initial investment of £10,000, providing trading services on behalf of high net worth individuals.

Following an investment from British Land, a London property firm, Shore grew the business, initially market-making in AIM-listed stocks and then in fully listed stocks on the London Stock Exchange. In 2000, following the acquisition of internet firm Jellyworks, Shore Capital floated on the AIM stock market.

In 2006 Puma Brandenburg Limited was established, initially as a listed property investment vehicle focused on German real estate. It was subsequently taken private by Shore and his wife, and is now the main vehicle through which he conducts his private investment activities. As well as real estate in Germany, the US and Israel, it has invested in other asset classes including providing growth capital for entrepreneurially led private businesses.

In 2015, Shore established Brandenburg Realty Limited, raising funds from institutional investors and family offices, predominantly from the United States, to invest in German residential real estate.

Shore announced that he was relinquishing operational responsibilities for Shore Capital in 2017 but he remains as chairman of the Group.

== Tottenham Hotspur ==
Between 2001 and 2003, Shore served as a non-executive director at Tottenham Hotspur FC, of which he is a lifelong supporter.

== Political activity ==
Howard Shore is a prominent supporter of the UK Conservative Party and in 2006 became one of the earliest financial backers of the new leader David Cameron. He is a consistent advocate for lighter regulation of the private sector in the UK and was prominent among the business community in calling for the UK to leave the European Union. In 2019 Conservative Party leadership election, Shore financially backed the then Home Secretary, Sajid Javid, and was a significant supporter of Prime Minister Boris Johnson before his resignation.

== Philanthropy ==
Howard’s philanthropic interests cover healthcare, education and the arts. In 2022, Howard was appointed International Business Trustee of the Tate. In April 2023, he was appointed to the Board of the Prostate Cancer Foundation.
