= Japan Standard Time =

Standard time zone in Japan

- Time zone

UTC offset
- JST: UTC+09:00

Current time
- 08:55, 29 September 2026 JST [refresh]

Observance of DST
- DST is not observed in this time zone.

Japan Standard Time

Japanese name
- Kanji: 日本標準時
- Kana: にほん ひょうじゅんじ にっぽん ひょうじゅんじ
Transcriptions
- Romanization: Nihon Hyōjunji; Nippon Hyōjunji

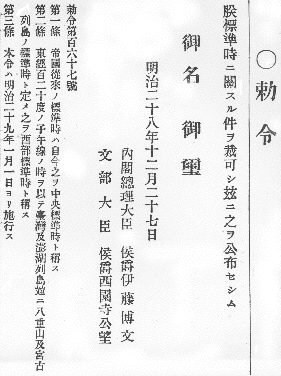
Imperial Ordinance 167 issued on December 27, Meiji 28 (1895)

Japan Standard Time (日本標準時, Nihon Hyōjunji; JST), or Japan Central Standard Time (中央標準時, Chūō Hyōjunji; JCST), is the standard time zone in Japan, 9 hours ahead of UTC (UTC+09:00). Japan does not observe daylight saving time, though its introduction has been debated on several occasions. During World War II, the time zone was often referred to as Tokyo Standard Time.

Japan Standard Time is equivalent to Korean Standard Time, Pyongyang Time (North Korea), Eastern Indonesia Standard Time, East Timorese Standard Time, Palau Time, and Yakutsk Time (Russia).

== History ==
Before the Meiji era (1868–1912), each local region had its own time zone in which noon was when the sun was exactly at its culmination. As modern transportation methods, such as trains, were adopted, this practice became a source of confusion. For example, there is a difference of about 5 degrees longitude between Tokyo and Osaka and because of this, a train that departed from Tokyo would arrive at Osaka 20 minutes behind the time in Tokyo. In 1886, Ordinance 51 was issued in response to this problem, which stated:

Ordinance 51 (on the precise calculation of time using the Prime Meridian) – July 13, 1886

- The prime meridian passes through England's Greenwich Observatory.
- Longitudes are calculated using the prime meridian, counting 180 degrees either east or west. Positive degrees are east, negative degrees are west.
- On January 1, 1888, 135 degrees east longitude will be set as the standard meridian for all of Japan, allowing precise times to be fixed.

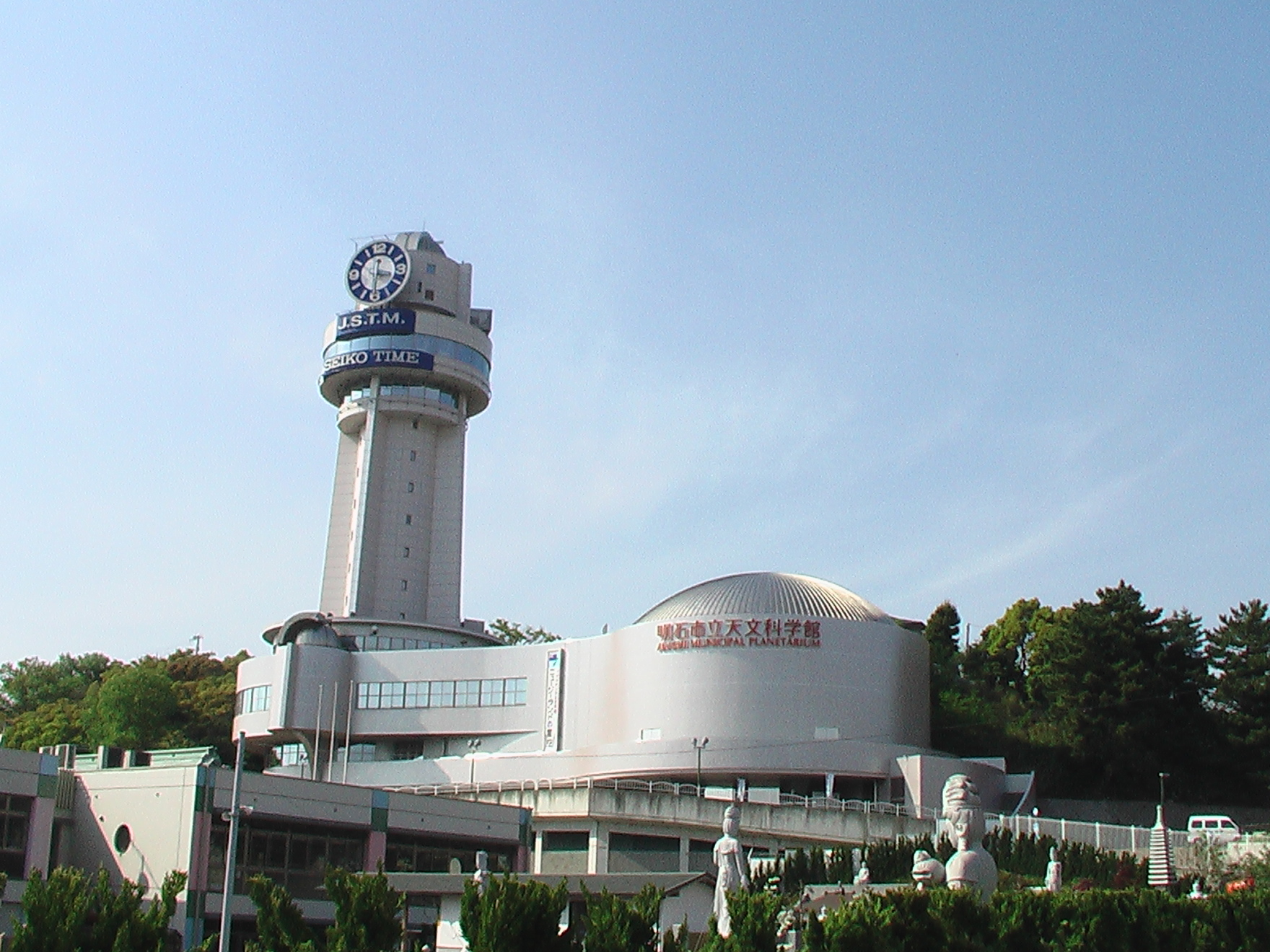
Akashi Municipal Planetarium, located exactly on 135°E longitude, and known as a symbol of Japan Standard Time

According to this, the standard time (標準時, hyōjunji) was set 9 hours ahead of GMT (UTC had not been established yet). In the ordinance, the first clause mentions GMT, the second defines east longitude and west longitude and the third says the standard time zone would be in effect from 1888. The city of Akashi in Hyōgo Prefecture is located exactly on 135 degrees east longitude and subsequently became known as Toki no machi (Town of Time).

With the annexation of Taiwan in 1895, Ordinance 167 (pictured on the right) was issued to rename the previous Standard Time to Central Standard Time (中央標準時, Chūō Hyōjunji) and establish a new Western Standard Time (西部標準時, Seibu Hyōjunji) at 120° longitude as the time zone for the Japanese Miyako and Yaeyama Islands, as well as Taiwan and its Penghu Islands. While Korea came under Japanese rule in 1910, Korea Standard Time of GMT+08:30 continued to be used until 1912, when it was changed to Central Standard Time.

Western Standard Time, which was used in Taiwan and some parts of Okinawa, was abolished by Ordinance 529 in 1937 and replaced by Central Standard Time in those areas. Territories occupied by Japan during World War II, including Singapore and Malaya, adopted Japan Standard Time for the duration of their occupation, but reverted after Japan's surrender.

Between 1948 and 1951 occupied Japan observed daylight saving time (DST) from the first Saturday in May at 24:00 to the second Saturday in September at 24:00 (with the exception of 1949, when the spring forward transition was the first Saturday in April at 24:00). More recently there have been efforts to restore daylight saving time in Japan but these have not succeeded.

In May 2013, former Tokyo governor Naoki Inose proposed permanently moving the country's time zone ahead by 2 hours to better align global markets and make Japan's stock market to be the first to open in the world at any given time.

== Time zones of the Japanese Empire ==
The two-time-zone system was implemented in Japan between January 1896 and September 1937:

Time offset	Name	Japanese	Romanization	Region
GMT+08:00	Western Standard Time	西部標準時	Seibu Hyōjunji	Western Okinawa and Taiwan (see also Time in Taiwan)
GMT+09:00	Central Standard Time	中央標準時	Chūō Hyōjunji	Japan mainland and Korea (see also Korea Standard Time)

From October 1937, Central Standard Time was also used in western Okinawa and Taiwan.

== IANA time zone database ==
The IANA time zone database contains one zone for Japan in the file zone.tab, named Asia/Tokyo.

== Daylight saving time in Japan ==
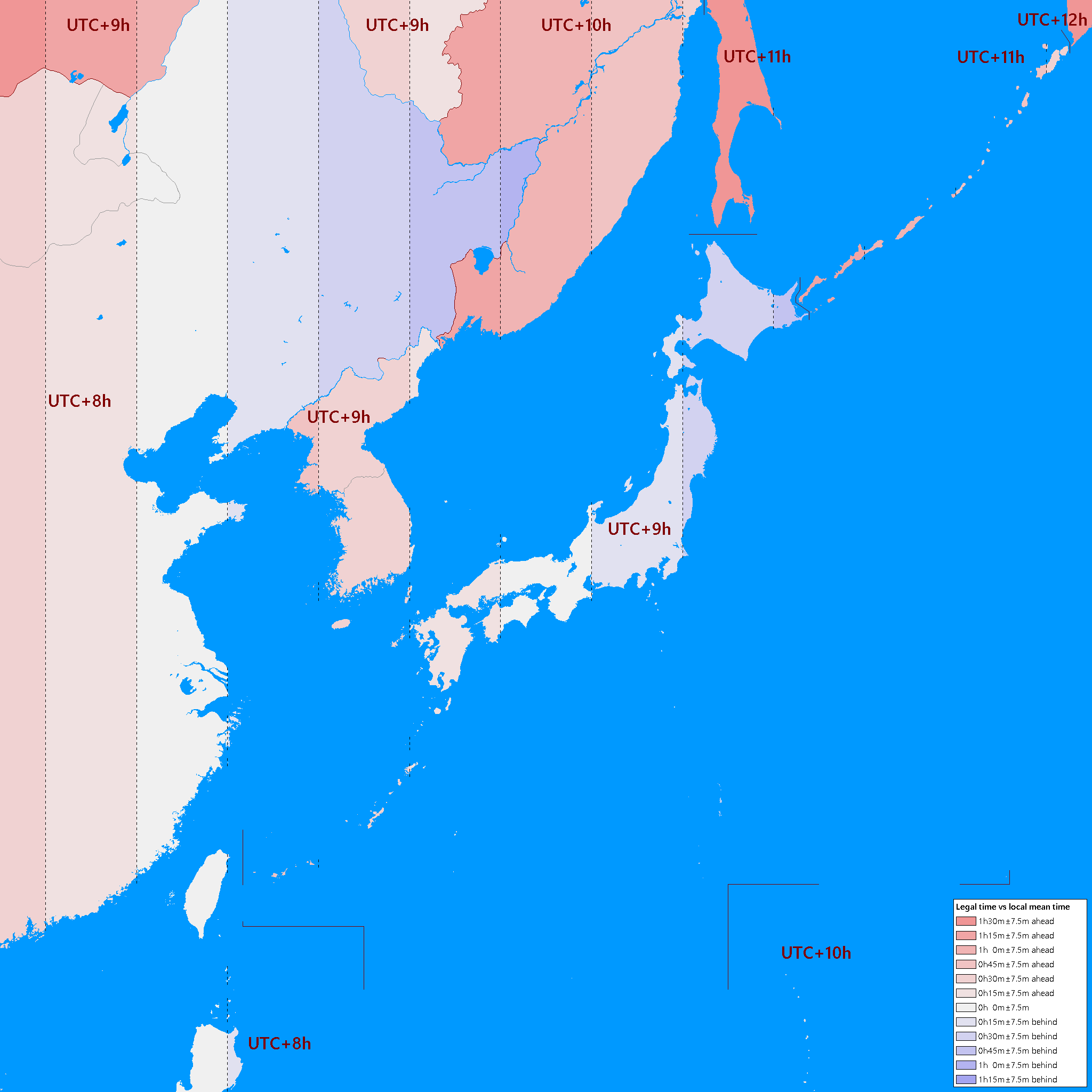
This map shows the difference between legal time and local mean time in Japan and its neighborhood. Eastern part of Hokkaido is over 30 minutes behind and western part of Ryukyu islands is over 30 minutes ahead of local solar time as a single standard time offset of UTC+09:00 is observed in whole country of Japan, even in its easternmost territory, Minamitorishima (153°59′E) and its westernmost territory, Yonaguni (122°56′E). It makes the sun rise before 04:00 at the summer solstice in much of the Hokkaido region and set shortly after 19:00 at the summer solstice in much of the eastern part of the country.

From 1948 to 1952, Japan observed daylight saving time (DST) between May and September every year. The United States imposed this policy as part of the Allied occupation of Japan. In 1952, three weeks before the occupation ended, the Japanese government, which had been granted increased powers, abolished daylight saving time, and the Allied occupation authorities did not interfere. Since then, DST has never been officially implemented nationwide in Japan.

Starting in the late 1990s, a movement to reinstate DST in Japan gained some popularity, aiming at saving energy and increasing recreational time. The Hokkaido region is particularly in favour of this movement because daylight starts as early as 03:30 (in standard time) there in summer due to its high latitude and its location near the eastern edge of the time zone, with much of the region's solar time actually closer to UTC+10:00. Because of this, the sun sets shortly after 19:00 in much of the eastern part of the country (in Tokyo, the latest sunset of the entire year is 19:01, from June 26 to July 1, despite being at 35°41'N latitude). Since 2000, a few local governments and commerce departments have promoted unmandated hour-earlier work schedule experiments during the summer without officially resetting clocks.

In 2007, the Council on Economic and Fiscal Policy of the Cabinet Office considered reinstating DST to combat global warming, in an effort led by Japanese former Prime Minister Shinzō Abe. It was unsuccessful. However, it is not clear that DST would conserve energy in Japan. A 2007 simulation estimated that introducing DST to Japan would increase energy use in Osaka residences by 0.13%, with a 0.02% saving due to lighting more than outweighed by a 0.15% increase due to cooling costs; the simulation did not examine non-residential buildings.

== Possibility of adjusting the time zone ==
On May 22, 2013, Governor of Tokyo Naoki Inose proposed a two-hour advance (UTC+11) Japan Standard Time at an industry competitiveness conference. Its purpose is to enhance the influence of the Japanese financial market by starting early in the Tokyo financial market. The Japanese government considered this proposal but did not act on it.

== See also ==
- Japanese calendar
- Japanese clock
- JJY
- UTC+09:00
