= Triple witching hour =

Term in stock market trading

Triple witching hour is the last hour of the stock market trading session (3:00–4:00 p.m., New York time) generally on the third Friday of every March, June, September, and December. In years when the March date coincides with Good Friday, the Triple Witching day is moved up to Thursday. Similarly, in years when the Juneteenth federal holiday falls on a Friday, because June 19 is a Friday or Saturday, the Triple Witching day is moved up to Thursday. In 2026, the dates are March 20, June 18 (Thursday), September 18, and December 18. In 2027, the dates are March 19, June 17 (Thursday), September 17, and December 17.

Those days are the expiration of three kinds of securities:

- Stock market index futures;
- PM-settled stock market index options;
- Stock options.

The simultaneous expirations generally increases the trading volume of options, futures, and their underlying stocks, occasionally increasing the volatility of prices of related securities.

On those same days single-stock futures also expire, so that the final hour is sometimes referred to as the quadruple witching hour.

== Concept and usage ==
The term "triple witching" refers to the extra volatility resulting from the expiration dates of the three financing instruments, and is based on the witching hour denoting the active time for witches.

It is used often and is considered industry jargon, along with the synonym, Freaky Friday.

== See also ==
- Program trading
- Swing trading
