= Equity derivative =

Class of financial derivatives

In finance, an equity derivative is a class of derivatives whose value is at least partly derived from one or more underlying equity securities. Options and futures are by far the most common equity derivatives, however there are many other types of equity derivatives that are actively traded.

== Equity options ==
Equity options are the most common type of equity derivative. They provide the right, but not the obligation, to buy (call) or sell (put) a quantity of stock (1 contract = 100 shares of stock), at a set price (strike price), within a certain period of time (prior to the expiration date).

== Warrants ==
In finance, a warrant is a security that entitles the holder to buy stock of the company that issued it at a specified price, which is much lower than the stock price at time of issue. Warrants are frequently attached to bonds or preferred stock as a sweetener, allowing the issuer to pay lower interest rates or dividends. They can be used to enhance the yield of the bond, and make them more attractive to potential buyers.

== Convertible bonds ==
Convertible bonds are bonds that can be converted into shares of stock in the issuing company, usually at some pre-announced ratio. It is a hybrid security with debt- and equity-like features. It can be used by investors to obtain the upside of equity-like returns while protecting the downside with regular bond-like coupons.

== Equity futures, options and swaps ==
Investors can gain exposure to the equity markets using futures, options and swaps. These can be done on single stocks, a customized basket of stocks or on an index of stocks. These equity derivatives derive their value from the price of the underlying stock or stocks.

=== Stock market index futures ===
Stock markets index futures are futures contracts used to replicate the performance of an underlying stock market index. They can be used for hedging against an existing equity position, or speculating on future movements of the index. Indices for futures include well-established indices such as S&P 500, FTSE 100, DAX, CAC 40 and other G12 country indices. Indices for OTC products are broadly similar, but offer more flexibility.

=== Equity basket derivatives ===
Equity basket derivatives are futures, options or swaps where the underlying is a non-index basket of shares. They have similar characteristics to equity index derivatives, but are always traded OTC (over the counter, i.e. between established institutional investors), as the basket definition is not standardized in the way that an equity index is.

These are used normally for correlation trading.

=== Single-stock futures ===
Single-stock futures are exchange-traded futures contracts based on an individual underlying security rather than a stock index. Their performance is similar to that of the underlying equity itself, although as futures contracts they are usually traded with greater leverage. Another difference is that holders of long positions in single stock futures typically do not receive dividends and holders of short positions do not pay dividends. Single-stock futures may be cash-settled or physically settled by the transfer of the underlying stocks at expiration, although in the United States only physical settlement is used to avoid speculation in the market.

=== Equity swap ===
An equity swap is an exchange of future cash flows between two parties that allows each party to diversify its income for a specified period of time while still holding its original assets. The two sets of nominally equal cash flows are exchanged as per the terms of the swap, which may involve an equity-based cash flow (such as from a stock asset) that is traded for a fixed-income cash flow (such as a benchmark rate), but this is not necessarily the case. Besides diversification and tax benefits, equity swaps also allow large institutions to hedge specific assets or positions in their portfolios.

== Exchange-traded derivatives ==
Other examples of equity derivative securities include exchange-traded funds and Intellidexes.
