= Currency future =

Type of futures contract

A currency future, also known as an FX future or a foreign exchange future, is a futures contract to exchange one currency for another at a specified date in the future at a price (exchange rate) that is fixed on the purchase date; see Foreign exchange derivative.

Typically, one of the currencies is the US dollar. The price of a future is then in terms of US dollars per unit of other currency. This can be different from the standard way of quoting in the spot foreign exchange markets. The trade unit of each contract is then a certain amount of other currency, for instance €125,000. Most contracts have physical delivery, so for those held at the end of the last trading day, actual payments are made in each currency. However, most contracts are closed out before that. Investors can close out the contract at any time prior to the contract's delivery date.

== History ==
Currency futures were first created in 1970 at the International Commercial Exchange in New York. But the contracts did not "take off" because the Bretton Woods system was still in effect. On 15 August 1971, President Richard Nixon abandoned both the gold standard and the system of fixed exchange rates. Some commodity traders at the Chicago Mercantile Exchange (CME) did not have access to the inter-bank exchange markets in the early 1970s, when they believed that significant changes were about to take place in the currency market. The CME established the International Monetary Market (IMM) and launched trading in seven currency futures on May 16, 1972.

The CME actually now gives credit to the International Commercial Exchange (not to be confused with ICE) for creating the currency contract, and state that they came up with the idea independently of the International Commercial Exchange. Today, the IMM is a division of CME. In the fourth quarter of 2009, CME Group FX volume averaged 754,000 contracts per day, reflecting average daily notional value of approximately $100 billion. Currently most of these are traded electronically.

Other futures exchanges that trade currency futures are Euronext.liffe and Intercontinental Exchange .

== Terms ==
For currency futures traded on the CME the conventional maturity dates are the IMM dates, namely the third Wednesday in March, June, September and December. The conventional option maturity dates are the first Friday after the first Wednesday for the given month.

More recently, serial months have been added. For instance, EUR/USD terms are now 20 consecutive quarters (5 years) plus 3 serial contract months.

== Uses ==
=== Hedging ===
Investors use these futures contracts to hedge against foreign exchange risk. If an investor will receive cash denominated in a foreign currency on some future date, the current exchange rate can be locked in by entering into an offsetting currency futures position that expires on the date the cash is due, used only if the rate worsens.

For example, Jane is a US-based investor who will receive €1,000,000 on December 1; the current exchange rate is $1.2 /€. She can insure against the rate worsening by locking in this exchange rate, buying €1,000,000 worth of futures contracts guaranteeing an exchange rate of $1.2 /€ on December 1 regardless of fluctuations. If the exchange rate does not worsen, the contract is abandoned and its cost lost, the price of insurance.

=== Speculation ===
Currency futures are used to speculate by attempting to profit from rising exchange rates, but with the risk of a loss.

For example, Peter buys 10 September CME Euro FX Futures for €1,250,000 (each contract worth €125,000), at $1.2713 /€. Each change of $0.0001 /€ (the minimum commodity tick size), produces a profit of US$12.50 per contract if the rate increases. At the end of the day, the futures settle at $1.2784 /€. The change in price is $0.0071 /€. As each contract is equal to €125,000, and he has 10 contracts, his profit is US$8,875, which is credited to Peter's account. However, if the settlement price for the contract is below $1.2713 /€, Peter's account will be debited the difference as a part of the daily settlement procedure for futures contracts.

== See also ==
- List of finance topics
- Forward contract
- Foreign exchange market
- Foreign exchange derivative
- Currency swap
