= International Monetary Market =

One of four divisions of the CME Group

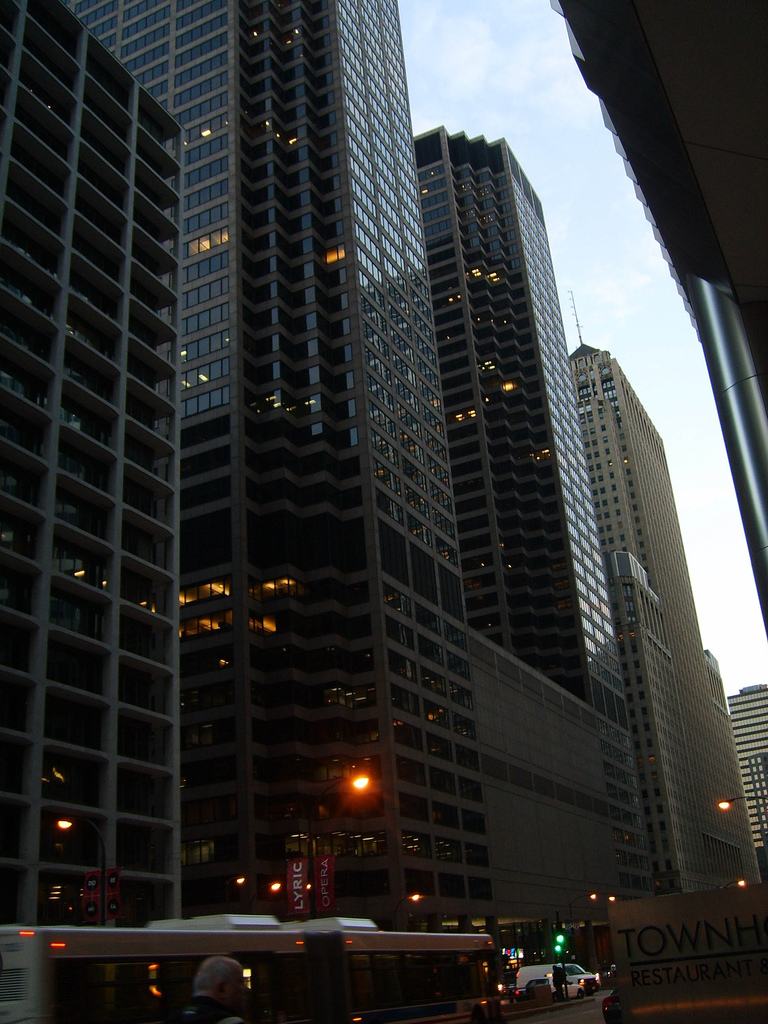
Chicago Mercantile Exchange

The International Monetary Market (IMM), a related exchange created within the old Chicago Mercantile Exchange and largely the creation of Leo Melamed, was one of four divisions of the CME Group (CME), the largest futures exchange in the United States, for the trading of futures contracts and options on futures. The IMM was started in December 1971, foreign exchange futures was started on May 16, 1972, and the IMM was merged into the CME in 1986. Two of the more prevalent contracts traded are currency futures and interest rate futures, specifically, 3-month Eurodollar time deposits and 90-day U.S. Treasury bills. The other two CME divisions includes the Index and Option Market (IOM) and Growth and Emerging Markets (GEM). All products fall under one of these three divisions.

== See also ==
- List of futures exchanges
- IMM dates
