= TFX =

TFX may refer to:

- TFX Program, a fighter aircraft requirement for the United States that led to the General Dynamics F-111 Aardvark
- TFX (video game), a combat flight simulation game (full title TFX: Tactical Fighter eXperiment)
- Tokyo Financial Exchange (TFX), a futures exchange for trading futures contracts
- TAI TFX, a proposed fighter aircraft for Turkish Air Force service
- TFX, a power supply specification
- TFX (TV channel), French TV channel, previously NT1
