= Interest rate future =

Futures contract on an interest-bearing instrument

An interest rate future is a futures contract (a financial derivative) with an interest-bearing instrument as the underlying asset. It is a particular type of interest rate derivative. Examples include Treasury-bill futures, Treasury-bond futures and Eurodollar futures.

As of 2019, the global market for exchange-traded interest rate futures was notionally valued by the Bank for International Settlements at $34,771 billion.

== Uses ==
Interest rate futures are used to hedge against the risk that interest rates will move in an adverse direction, causing a cost to the company.

For example, borrowers face the risk of interest rates rising. Futures use the inverse relationship between interest rates and bond prices to hedge against the risk of rising interest rates. A borrower will enter to sell a future today. Then if interest rates rise in the future, the value of the future will fall (as it is linked to the underlying asset, bond prices), and hence a profit can be made when closing out of the future (i.e. buying the future).

Treasury futures are contracts sold on the Globex market for March, June, September and December contracts. As pressure to raise interest rates rises, futures contracts will reflect that speculation as a decline in price. Price and yield will always be in an inversely correlated relationship.

Interest rate futures are not directly correlated with the market interest rates. When one enters into an interest rate futures contract (like a bond future), the trader has ability to eventually take delivery of the underlying asset. In the case of notes and bonds this means the trader could potentially take delivery of a bunch of bonds if the contract is not cash settled. The bonds which the seller can deliver vary depending on the futures contract. The seller can choose to deliver a variety of bonds to the buyer that fit the definitions laid out in the contract. The futures contract price takes this into account, therefore prices have less to do with current market interest rates, and more to do with what existing bonds in the market are cheapest to deliver to the buyer.

== Short-term interest rate futures ==
A short-term interest rate (STIR) future is a futures contract that derives its value from the interest rate at maturation. Common short-term interest rate futures are Eurodollar, Euribor, Euroyen, Short Sterling and Euroswiss, which are calculated on LIBOR at settlement, with the exception of Euribor which is based on Euribor and Euroyen which is based on TIBOR. This value is calculated as 100 minus the interest rate. Contracts vary, but are often defined upon an interest rate index such as 3-month sterling or US dollar LIBOR.

They are traded across a wide range of currencies, including the G12 country currencies and many others.

Some representative contracts are:

Region	Contract	Exchange	Notes
United States	90-day Eurodollar	CME	Terminated in June 2023 → converted to 3-Month SOFR futures
United States	SOFR 1-month & 3-month futures	CME	Active
United States	Federal funds 30-day	CBOT	Active
Europe	3-month Euribor	Euronext.liffe	Active
Europe	90-day Sterling LIBOR	Euronext.liffe	Active
Europe	Euro Sfr	Euronext.liffe	Active
Asia-Pacific	3-month Euroyen	TIF	Terminated in 2024 → replaced by TONA futures
Asia-Pacific	90-day Bank Bill	SFE	Active
Asia-Pacific	BIBOR 3-month (BB3)	TFEX	Active

where

- CME is the Chicago Mercantile Exchange
- CBOT is the Chicago Board of Trade
- TIF is the Tokyo International Financial Futures Exchange
- SFE is the Sydney Futures Exchange
- TFEX is the Thailand Futures Exchange

As an example, consider the definition of the Chicago Mercantile Exchange Eurodollar interest rate future, the most widely and deeply traded financial futures contract.

- They are listed on a 10-year cycle. Other markets only extend about 2–4 years.
- Last Trading Day is the second London business day preceding the third Wednesday of the contract month.
- Delivery Day is cash settlement on the third Wednesday.
- The minimum fluctuation (Commodity tick size) is half a basis point or 0.005%.
- Payment is the difference between the price paid for the contract (in ticks) multiplied by the "tick value" of the contract which is $12.50 per tick.
- Before the Last Trading Day the contract trades at market prices. The Final Settlement Price is the British Bankers Association (BBA) percentage rate for Three–Month Eurodollar Interbank Time Deposits, rounded to the nearest 1/10000th of a percentage point at 11:00 London time on that day, subtracted from 100. (Expressing financial futures prices as 100 minus the implied interest rate was originally intended to make the contract price behave similarly to a Bond price in that an increase in price corresponds to a decrease in yield).

Short-term interest rate futures are extensively used in the hedging of interest rate swaps.

=== Exchange-traded Strategies ===
A great deal of the trading on these contracts is exchange traded multi-leg strategies, essentially bets upon the future shape of the yield curve and/or basis. Both Liffe and CME allow direct exchange trading in calendar spreads (the order book for spreads is separate from that of the underlying futures), which are quoted in terms of implied prices (price differences between futures of different expiries). Exchange-traded futures spreads greatly reduce execution risk and slippage, allowing traders to place guaranteed limit orders for entire spreads, otherwise impossible when entering into spreads via two separate futures orders.

== See also ==
- Forward contract
- Interest rate derivative
- Interest rate swap
- Mathematical finance
