= Witching Hour =

Witching hour is a time of night associated with supernatural events.

Witching Hour or The Witching Hour may also refer to:

== Literature ==
- The Witching Hour (play), 1907 play by Augustus Thomas
- The Witching Hour (DC Comics), a comic horror anthology published 1969–1978.
- "The Witching Hour", Chapter 1 of The BFG by Roald Dahl.
- The Witching Hour (novel), a 1990 horror novel by Anne Rice
- The Witching Hour (Vertigo), a 1999 graphic novel by writer Jeph Loeb and artist Chris Bachalo

== Film ==
- The Witching Hour, a 1916 film melodrama featuring Helen Arnold
- The Witching Hour (1921 film), an American silent drama
- The Witching Hour (1934 film), an American film
- The Witching Hour (1985 film), a Spanish film

== Music ==
=== Albums ===
- Witching Hour (Ladytron album), 2005
- Witching Hour (The Vision Bleak album), 2013

=== Songs ===
- "Witching Hour" (song), a 2018 song by Rezz
- "Witching Hour", a song on the 1981 album Welcome to Hell by Venom
- "Witching Hour", a song on the 2017 EP Fractured Fairytales by Blackbriar
- "Witching Hour", a song on the 2017 album Ritual by In This Moment
- "Witching Hour", a song by Madeline Kenney from Night Night at the First Landing
- "Witching Hour", a song by Nebula on the 2019 album Holy Shit
- "The Witching Hour", a song on the 1997 album The Divine Wings of Tragedy by Symphony X
- "The Witching Hour", a song on the 2010 album Familial by Phil Selway
- "The Witching Hour", a 1964 song by Quincy Jones

== Other uses ==
- The Witching Hour, a painting by Andrew Wyeth

== See also ==
- Triple witching hour, in American investing, the time near the end of each quarter when certain financial derivatives expire simultaneously
