= IMM dates =

Quarterly dates in finance

The IMM dates are the four quarterly dates of each year which certain money market and Foreign Exchange futures contracts and option contracts use as their scheduled maturity date or termination date. The dates are the third Wednesday of March, June, September and December (i.e., between the 15th and 21st, whichever such day is a Wednesday).

These contracts stop trading the Monday preceding the third Wednesday of a March quarterly cycle. see CME Tutorial

IMM stands for the International Monetary Market.

This choice of date – middle of month and middle of week – minimizes issues with date rolling, as holidays are very unlikely to make the closest business day in another week or other month.

The term is also used for the conventional quarterly termination dates of credit default swaps, which fall on 20 March, 20 June, 20 September and 20 December – note that these may fall on a weekend. These are not precisely the IMM dates, but they fall close to them and thus are also referred to as "IMM dates", by abuse of language.

== CDS standardization ==
From late 2002, the CDS market began to standardize credit default swap contracts so that they would all mature on one of the four days of 20 March, 20 June, 20 September and 20 December. These dates are used both as termination dates for the contracts and as the dates for quarterly premium payments.

So, for example, a ‘five-year’ contract traded any time between 20 September 2005 and 19 December 2005 would have a termination date of 20 December 2010.

In December 2015, the roll has been reduced to Semi Annual, i.e., only on September and March.

== Roll ==
Contracts are frequently rolled on the IMM dates, making them among the highest volume trading days of the year.
