= Organ futures =

Proposed futures contracts for human organs

Organ futures is the short term used in academic proposals for futures contracts on organs from human cadavers. They are not legal anywhere at this time.

Organ futures would be used as an economic means to encourage organ donation by compensating transplant organ donors. Financial futures contracts are essentially agreements to pay a specified sum at a specified time.

The four key academic papers describing proposals for organ futures were published between the mid-1980s and mid-1990s.

== Proposals ==
The explanations below focus on donation of cadaveric organs and ignore living donation.

=== Proposal by Schwindt, Vining 1986 ===
Schwindt & Vining (1986) suggest that the organ donor is paid at the time they agree to enter the life-time futures contract. The agreement is mutually revocable. They propose a single government broker as the buyer. Organ recipients would pay the supply price plus a load factor to the broker.

=== Proposal by Hansmann 1989 ===
Hansmann (1989) also suggests payment at the time of contract. Instead of direct payment, he proposes reductions to health insurance premiums as indirect incentive. The hospital where the organ donor dies is expected to verify a seller registry and determine the buyer. Buyers may be health insurance providers or specialist traders.

=== Proposal by Cohen 1989 ===
Cohen (1989) introduces a significant change to previous proposals by making payment conditional on organ extraction. Thus, the donor is not directly compensated during their lifetime. However, the payment is allocated to their estate or a designee. Hospitals are expected to notify buyers and preserve cadavers. They can be made liable for consequences of negligence. Buyers may be public or private organizations.

=== Proposal by Crespi 1994 ===
Crespi (1994) aims to integrate what he deems the most useful aspects of previous models into his own. Payment would be either guaranteed upon death or dependent on organ extraction. The money would go to the seller's estate; rights would not be assignable, and creditors would not have any claim on it. Hospitals are expected to notify the buyer, preserve the body and be prepared to harvest the organs if required. Any legally competent person can be a buyer and assign their rights freely.

== Current status ==
Currently, organ futures are legally unfeasible because most countries follow international guidance that requires financial neutrality from the donor.
