= Intellidex =

An Intellidex is a securities product created by and proprietary to the American Stock Exchange. Intellidexes are created by analyzing groups of company shares and selecting specific stocks to include in an investment portfolio. These portfolios range from narrow to broad in scope and are usually created based on criteria matching the company shares market as a whole, specific investment styles, or certain industry sectors. Intellidexes and similar products are usually traded like normal listed or over-the-counter securities.
