= Stock market index option =

A stock market index option is a type of option, a financial derivative, that is based on stock indices like the S&P 500 or the Dow Jones Industrial Average. They give an investor the right to buy or sell the value of the underlying stock index for a defined time period. Because index options are based on a large basket of stocks, they allow investors to gain exposure to the market as a whole and take advantage of diversification. Index options may be tied to the price of either "broad-based indexes" like the S&P 500 or the Russell 3000 or to "narrow-based indexes", which are limited to a particular industry. The global market for exchange-traded stock market index options was notionally valued by the Bank for International Settlements (BIS) at $368,900 million in 2005.

A stock index option provides the right to trade an amount of cash based on the level of a specific index at a specified price by a specified expiration date. A call option on a stock index gives the holder the right to buy the index value, and a put option on a stock index gives the holder the right to sell the index value.

One difference between stock index options and index exchange-traded funds (ETFs) is that ETF values change throughout the day, whereas the intrinsic value of a stock index option is based on the index value at a certain time, usually the value at market closing time. If an index option is exercised before the close of the market, the buyer of the option will be in- or out-of-the-money for an additional amount equal to the difference between the closing price and the exercise price. For this reason, index options are typically exercised after the market has closed.

== See also ==
- Stock market index future
- Derivative (finance)
- Financial risk management § Investment management
