= OneChicago =

All-electronic futures exchange located in Chicago, Illinois, United States

- Type: Single stock futures exchange
- Location: Chicago, United States
- Founded: May 14, 2001
- Closed: September 18, 2020
- Owner: IB Exchange Group; CBOE Holdings; CME Group
- Key people: David Downey (CEO), Thomas McCabe (CRO), Jordan Cloud (CTO), Peter Borish (Chairman)
- Currency: USD
- No. of listings: 10,321
- Volume: 11 million contracts/year (2014)
- Website: www.onechicago.com

OneChicago was a US-based all-electronic futures exchange with headquarters in Chicago, Illinois. The exchange offered approximately 12,509 single-stock futures (SSF) products with names such as IBM, Apple and Google. All trading was cleared through Options Clearing Corporation (OCC). The OneChicago exchange closed in September 2020.

The exchange was owned jointly by IB Exchange Group (IB), CBOE Holdings, and CME Group. It was a privately held company that was regulated by both the Securities and Exchange Commission and the Commodity Futures Trading Commission.

== History ==
The Commodity Futures Modernization Act of 2000 legalized U.S. trading in single-stock futures, and two exchanges began operations on November 8, 2002. OneChicago began as a joint venture of the Chicago Board Options Exchange, the Chicago Mercantile Exchange, and the Chicago Board of Trade. The other exchange, NQLX (owned by Euronext.liffe), closed in December 2004 and assigned its remaining contracts to OneChicago. In 2006, IB bought 40% of OneChicago, with Chicago Mercantile Exchange and CBOE each retaining 24% and the remainder belonging to the Chicago Board of Trade and OneChicago management. (The Chicago Mercantile Exchange and the Chicago Board of Trade merged in 2007 to form CME Group.) The OneChicago exchange closed in September 2020.

== Operations ==
=== Trading Volume ===
It was reported by OneChicago on January 4, 2016, that 1,476,641 contracts traded in December 2015 for a total 2015 volume of 11,714,015, up 7% from the prior year. This was a new yearly volume record for the exchange, and the third record year in a row.

=== Electronic platforms and clearing ===
Delta1 was OneChicago's proprietary order matching and trade reporting platform. On October 20, 2014, Delta1 replaced the OCX.BETS platform for blocks and EFP orders and in January 2015 introduced support for a Central Limit Order Book (CLOB).

Members of the CME Group and CBOE were automatically members of OneChicago and any clearing member of the Options Clearing Corporation who was permissioned for Security Futures could also route orders for execution. OneChicago securities futures were traded in either a securities account or a futures account.

== Products ==
=== Securities Futures Contracts ===
The exchange offered 13,380 (as of January 20, 2016) security futures, including 2662 futures on exchange-traded funds and 1846 No Dividend Risk. A OneChicago single stock futures contract was an agreement to deliver 100 shares of a specific stock at a designated date in the future, called the expiration date. OneChicago offers traditional monthly (SSQQ) and weekly expiration cycles.

The No Dividend Risk products treat ordinary dividends as corporate events by adjusting the previous days’ settlement price by the dividend amount the morning of the Ex-dividend Date.

=== Weekly Spreads and Synthetic Bonds ===
An expiring weekly spread is an exchange traded centrally cleared alternative to traditional OTC stock loan and dealer equity repo. If you own stock, buying the expiring weekly spread, (meaning sell the expiring future as the first leg and buy the deferred expiration as the second leg) closes out your stock position and establishes a long futures position, thus transferring your delta from the stock to the future. Your stock position is closed out by delivering the stock to fulfill to the counterparty your short future obligation the next day (first leg) while your long position is maintained by your futures position till the deferred expiration date (second leg).

If the underlying stock is hard to borrow, the hard to borrow premium is reflected in the futures buy price being lower than the stock sale price (a so-called backwardation). In essence, you are synthetically loaning out your stock and collecting the hard to borrow premium.

If the underlying stock is general collateral, the repo rate is reflected in the futures buy price being higher than the stock sale price (a so-called contango). In essence, you are monetizing your stocks and are paying interest on the sale proceeds. Selling single stock futures against their underlying stocks. This is a so-called synthetic bonds.

=== Exchange Future for Physical (EFP) ===
An Exchange Futures for Physical (EFP) is a combination order to buy (or sell) an amount of underlying stock and simultaneously sell (or buy) the equivalent number of SSFs with a counterparty who buys (or sells) the corresponding underlying (or SSF). EFP trading allows for the trade of a short (or long) underlying position for a short (or long) SSF position. An EFP, as an integrated transaction, has no market exposure risk as the Stock and the SSF have identical delta values. The two parties to the transaction are simply shifting to an equivalent position on more favorable financing terms.

As of the close of business on May 14, 2014, OneChicago suspended trading in competitive EFPs. Privately negotiated, off-exchange EFPs may still be transacted by market participants and then reported on OneChicago's Delta1 (formerly OCX.BETS) platform.

== See also ==
- List of stock exchanges
- List of stock exchanges in the Americas
