= London International Financial Futures and Options Exchange =

Futures exchange located in London, UK (founded 1982)

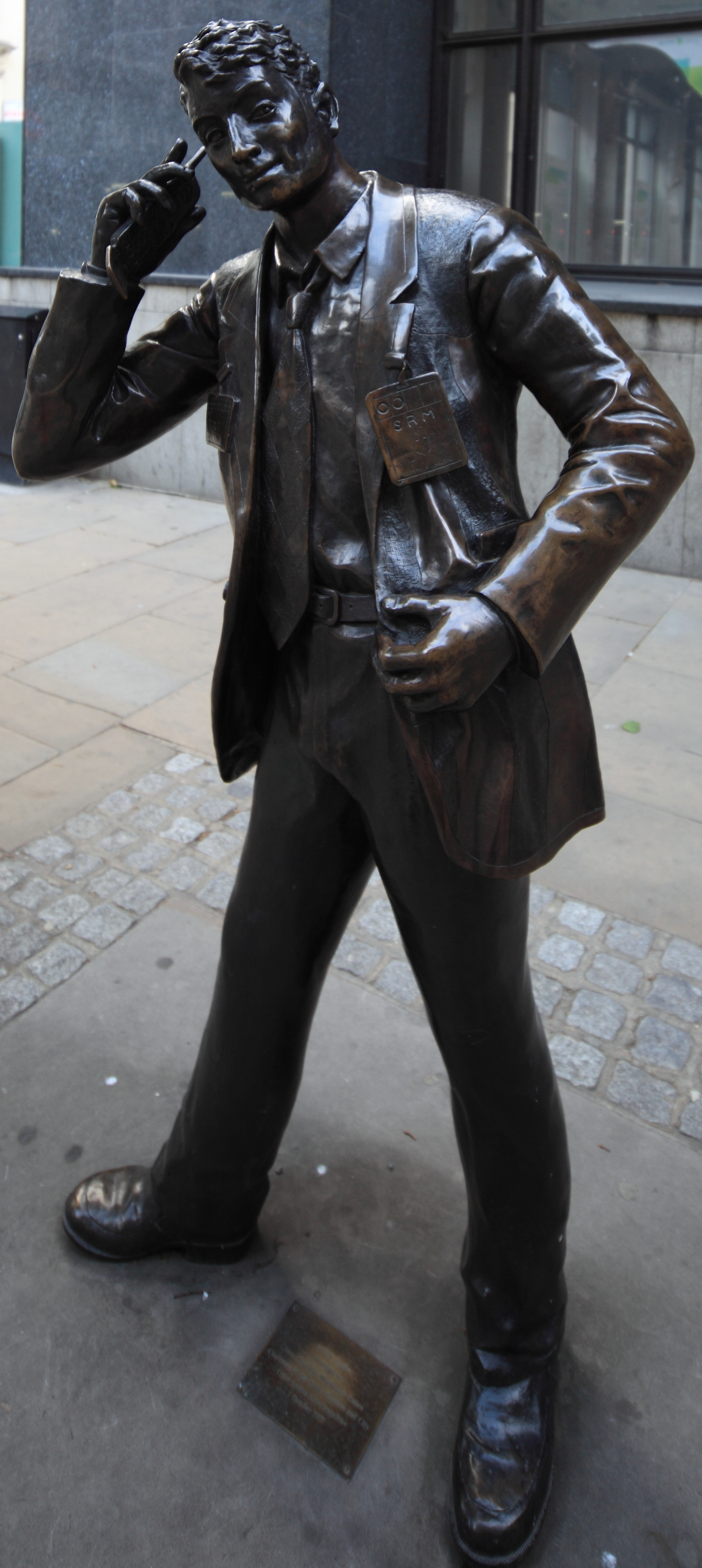
LIFFE Trader statue by Stephen Melton at Dowgate Hill opposite Cannon Bridge house.

The London International Financial Futures and Options Exchange (LIFFE, pronounced 'life') was a futures exchange based in London. In 2014, following a series of takeovers, LIFFE became part of Intercontinental Exchange, and was renamed ICE Futures Europe.

Euronext acquired LIFFE in 2002, and were then in turn taken over by NYSE in 2007, to form NYSE Euronext. In the same manner, Intercontinental Exchange then purchased NYSE Euronext in 2013.

== History ==
The London International Financial Futures Exchange (LIFFE), established by Sir Brian Williamson started life on 30 September 1982, to take advantage of the removal of currency controls in the UK in 1979. The exchange modelled itself after the Chicago Board of Trade and the Chicago Mercantile Exchange. It initially offered futures contracts and options linked to short-term interest rates. In 1993 LIFFE merged with the London Traded Options Market (LTOM), adding equity options to its product range. This is when it changed its name to the London International Financial Futures and Options Exchange. In 1996 it merged with the London Commodity Exchange (LCE), and, as a result, a range of soft and agricultural commodity contracts was added to its products offering. Trading was conducted by open outcry, where traders meet on the trading floor (in what is called the pit) to conduct trades. The Exchange was originally housed in the historic Royal Exchange building near Bank but then moved to Cannon Bridge in 1991.

By the end of 1996, LIFFE was by far the biggest futures exchange in Europe, followed by the MATIF in Paris and the Deutsche Terminbörse (DTB) in Frankfurt. The DTB was an electronic exchange founded in 1990 and the predecessor to Eurex. LIFFE's most-traded product was a futures contract on Bunds, the 10-year German Government Bond. The DTB offered an identical product but, as an electronic exchange, it had a lower cost base. The progress of DTB can be gauged from the fact that in mid-1997 the DTB had less than 25% of the market. By October, it had more than 50%, and a couple of months later LIFFE was left with only 10%. The Bund represented about a third of LIFFE's business. The exchange, which had turned in a profit of £57m in 1997, reported a loss of £64m in 1998. Its ambitious plans for enlarged trading floor and offices on a site near Spitalfields market were dropped (and became the ABN Amro UK HQ).

== Move to electronic trading ==
LIFFE had had big plans to expand, and intended to redevelop Spitalfields Market in the City of London as they needed a larger building for their open outcry. With the loss of the market for their main product, Bund futures contracts, all expansion plans were shelved. LIFFE realised that, to compete, it had urgently to develop an electronic trading platform instead. It already had an electronic platform called Automated Pit Trading (APT), which was used in after-hours trading when the trading pit was closed. LIFFE now developed a new trading platform, LIFFE CONNECT, for all trading, including the exchange's range of short-term interest rate derivatives contracts. After the creation of the euro in 1999 the exchange won the lion's share of trading in euro-denominated short-term interest rate derivatives – the EURIBOR contract.

On Friday 24 November 2000, at 5 pm, the last three of the once 26 open outcry pits were permanently closed. The design of LIFFE CONNECT made it possible for customers to choose which trading software they would use. LIFFE intended that this flexibility would encourage traders around the world to link to the exchange. And, by the beginning of 2002, customers in 25 countries around the world were trading on LIFFE. This completed a revolution in LIFFE's business: whereas traders had once had to come to LIFFE; now, through LIFFE CONNECT, LIFFE took its market to its customers wherever they were in the world.

Seeing LIFFE CONNECT's potential, the Blackstone Group and Battery Ventures invested £44m in Liffe to finance the commercial development of the trading platform so that it could be sold to other exchanges. Liffe went on to sell the technology to three exchanges, TIFFE (now renamed the Tokyo Financial Exchange) (2001), the Chicago Board of Trade (2003) and the Tokyo Stock Exchange (2008). Early in 2001 LIFFE said that it had returned to profit. In September that year the exchange announced that it had received a number of expressions of interest in buying the business.

In January 2002, LIFFE was acquired by Euronext, joining the exchanges of Amsterdam, Brussels, Paris and Lisbon.
