= Single-stock futures =

Futures contracts for trading company stocks

In finance, a single-stock future (SSF) is a type of futures contract between two parties to exchange a specified number of stocks in a company for a price agreed today (the futures price or the strike price) with delivery occurring at a specified future date, the delivery date. The contracts can be later traded on a futures exchange.

The party agreeing to take delivery of the underlying stock in the future, the "buyer" of the contract, is said to be "long", and the party agreeing to deliver the stock in the future, the "seller" of the contract, is said to be "short." The terminology reflects the expectations of the parties - the buyer hopes or expects that the stock price is going to increase, while the seller hopes or expects that it will decrease. Because entering the contract itself costs nothing, the buy/sell terminology is a linguistic convenience reflecting the position each party is taking - long or short.

SSFs are usually traded in increments/lots/batches of 100. When purchased, no transmission of share rights or dividends occurs. Being futures contracts they are traded on margin, thus offering leverage, and they are not subject to the short selling limitations that stocks are subjected to. They are traded in various financial markets, including those of the United States, United Kingdom, Spain, India and others. South Africa currently hosts the largest single-stock futures market in the world, trading on average 700,000 contracts daily.

== SSFs in the U.S. ==
In the United States, they were disallowed from any exchange listing in the 1980s because the Commodity Futures Trading Commission and the U.S. Securities and Exchange Commission were unable to decide which would have the regulatory authority over these products.

After the Commodity Futures Modernization Act of 2000 became law, the two agencies eventually agreed on a jurisdiction-sharing plan and SSF's began trading on November 8, 2002.

Two new exchanges initially offered security futures products, including single-stock futures, although one of these exchanges has since closed. The remaining market is known as OneChicago, a joint venture of three previously-existing Chicago-based exchanges, the Chicago Board Options Exchange, Chicago Mercantile Exchange and the Chicago Board of Trade. In 2006, the brokerage firm Interactive Brokers made an equity investment in OneChicago and is now a part-owner of the exchange. As of September 2020 OneChicago has been closed.

== Pricing ==
Single stock futures values are priced by the market in accordance with the standard theoretical pricing model for forward and futures contracts, which is:

$$F = [S - PV(Div)] \cdot (1 + r)^{(T-t)} \$$

where F is the current (time t) cost of establishing a futures contract, S is the current price (spot price) of the underlying stock, r is the annualized risk-free interest rate, t is the present time, T is the time when the contract expires and PV(Div) is the Present value of any dividends generated by the underlying stock between t and T.

When the risk-free rate is expressed as a continuous return, the contract price is:

$$F = [S - PV(Div)] \cdot e^{r \cdot (T-t)} \$$

where r is the risk free rate expressed as a continuous return, and e is the base of the natural log. Note the value of r will be slightly different in the two equations. The relationship between continuous returns and annualized returns is r_{c} = ln(1 + r).

The value of a futures contract is zero at the moment it is established, but changes thereafter until time T, at which point its value equals S_{T} - F_{t}, i.e., the current cost of the stock minus the originally established cost of the futures contract.

== See also ==
- Commodity Futures Trading Commission
- OneChicago
