= Stock market index future =

Cash-settled futures contract on the value of a particular stock market index

In finance, a stock market index future is a cash-settled futures contract on the value of a particular stock market index. The turnover for the global market in exchange-traded equity index futures is notionally valued, for 2008, by the Bank for International Settlements at US$130 trillion.

== Uses ==
Stock index futures are used for hedging, trading, and investments. Index futures are also used as leading indicators to determine market sentiment.

Hedging using stock index futures could involve hedging against a portfolio of shares or equity index options. Trading using stock index futures could involve, for instance, volatility trading (The greater the volatility, the greater the likelihood of profit taking – usually taking relatively small but regular profits). Investing via the use of stock index futures could involve exposure to a market or sector without having to actually purchase shares directly.

There are cases of equity hedging with index futures. One case is where a portfolio 'exactly' reflects the index (this is unlikely) so that the portfolio is perfectly hedged via the index future. Another case is where a portfolio does not entirely reflect the index (this is more likely to be the case). Here, the degree of correlation between the underlying asset and the hedge is not high. So, your portfolio is unlikely to be 'fully hedged'.

Equity index futures and index options tend to be in liquid markets for close to delivery contracts. They trade for cash delivery, usually based on a multiple of the underlying index on which they are defined (for example £10 per index point).

OTC products are usually for longer maturities, and are usually a form of options product. For example, the right but not the obligation to cash delivery based on the difference between the designated strike price, and the value of the designated index at the expiration date. These are traded in the wholesale market, but are often used as the basis of guaranteed equity products, which offer retail buyers a participation if the equity index rises over time, but which provides guaranteed return of capital if the index falls. Sometimes these products can take the form of exotic options (for example Asian options or Quanto options).

== Pricing ==
Forward prices of equity indices are calculated by computing the cost of carry of holding a long position in the constituent parts of the index. This will typically be the risk-free interest rate, since the cost of investing in the equity market is the loss of interest minus the estimated dividend yield on the index, since an equity investor receives the sum of the dividends on the component stocks. Since these dividends are paid at different times, and are difficult to predict, estimation of the forward price can be difficult, particularly if there are not many stocks in the chosen index.

Indices for futures are the well-established ones, such as S&P 500, FTSE, DAX, CAC 40 and other G12 country indices. Indices for OTC products are broadly similar, but offer more flexibility.

== See also ==
- Stock market index option
- Derivative (finance)
- S&P/ASX 200
- Financial risk management § Investment management
