= Tokyo Financial Exchange =

Tokyo Financial Exchange (TFX)
- Japanese: 東京金融取引所
- Type: Futures exchange
- Location: Tokyo, Japan
- Founded: April 1989; 36 years ago
- Key people: Nobuyuki Kinoshita (CEO)
- Currency: Japanese yen (JPY)
- Commodities: Interest rate futures, currency futures, equity index futures, options
- Website: www.tfx.co.jp/en/

The Tokyo Financial Exchange (TFX) (Japanese: 東京金融取引所, Hepburn: Tōkyō Kin'yū Torihikijo) is a Japanese futures exchange that was established in April 1989 under the Financial Futures Trading Law of Japan. It principally provides trading in futures and derivatives on interest rates, currencies and stock indices.

== History ==
The Tokyo Financial Exchange (TFX) was established under the Financial Futures Trading Law of Japan in April 1989. The TFX was created to be an exchange of for financial originated products. That April, the TFX held a membership organization with the capital supplied by large financial institutions around the world. By June 1989, the Tokyo International Financial Futures Exchange (TIFFE) was trading on three-month Euroyen futures, three-month Eurodollar futures, and Japanese Yen-US Dollar currency futures.

By April 2004, the TFX was demutualized and integrated to support corporate power, and the Financial Futures Trading Law was abolished. In lieu, the Financial Instruments and Exchange Law was revised and the Securities and Exchange Law was enacted in September 2007. With the new law, the TFX adds onto the growth of Japanese financial markets by catering to investors, as well as advocating the development of new lines of products. A TFX committee explored the idea of using a centralized counterpart to clear OTC derivatives, but reached the conclusion that TFX is the most likely institution for clearing OTC derivatives, since "it is the only exchange in Japan that specializes in trading and clearing financial derivatives".

Its current CEO is Nobuyuki Kinoshita.

== Alliances ==
The alliances that the Tokyo Financial Exchange share includes Euronext.liffe, in which the two signed a Memorandum of Understanding (MOU) to develop efficient procedures of both markets. This contract entails that three-month Euroyen futures traded on LIFFE will be transferred to the TFX at the close of LIFFE’s trading day. Another alliance the TFX possesses includes the Shanghai Futures Exchange, established May 27, 2005. Both parties signed a MOU agreement, covering information exchange on regulatory framework and market structure, financial futures products and marketing, and system infrastructure. Both parties nonetheless agree to occasional meetings on the executive and staff level.

== See also ==
- Euronext
- New York Mercantile Exchange
- Chicago Board of Trade
