= Stock market =

Place where stocks are traded

A stock market, equity market, or share market is the aggregation of buyers and sellers of stocks (also called as shares), which represent ownership claims on businesses; these may include securities listed on a public stock exchange as well as stock that is only traded privately, such as shares of private companies that are sold to investors through equity crowdfunding platforms. Investments are usually made with an investment strategy in mind.

== Size of the market ==
The total market capitalization of all publicly traded stocks worldwide rose from US$2.5 trillion in 1980 to US$111 trillion by the end of 2023.

As of 2016, there are 60 stock exchanges in the world. Of these, there are 16 exchanges with a market capitalization of $1 trillion or more, and they account for 87% of global market capitalization. Apart from the Australian Securities Exchange, these 16 exchanges are all in North America, Europe, or Asia.

By country, the largest stock markets as of January 2022 are in the United States of America (about 59.9%), followed by Japan (about 6.2%) and United Kingdom (about 3.9%).

== Stock exchange ==
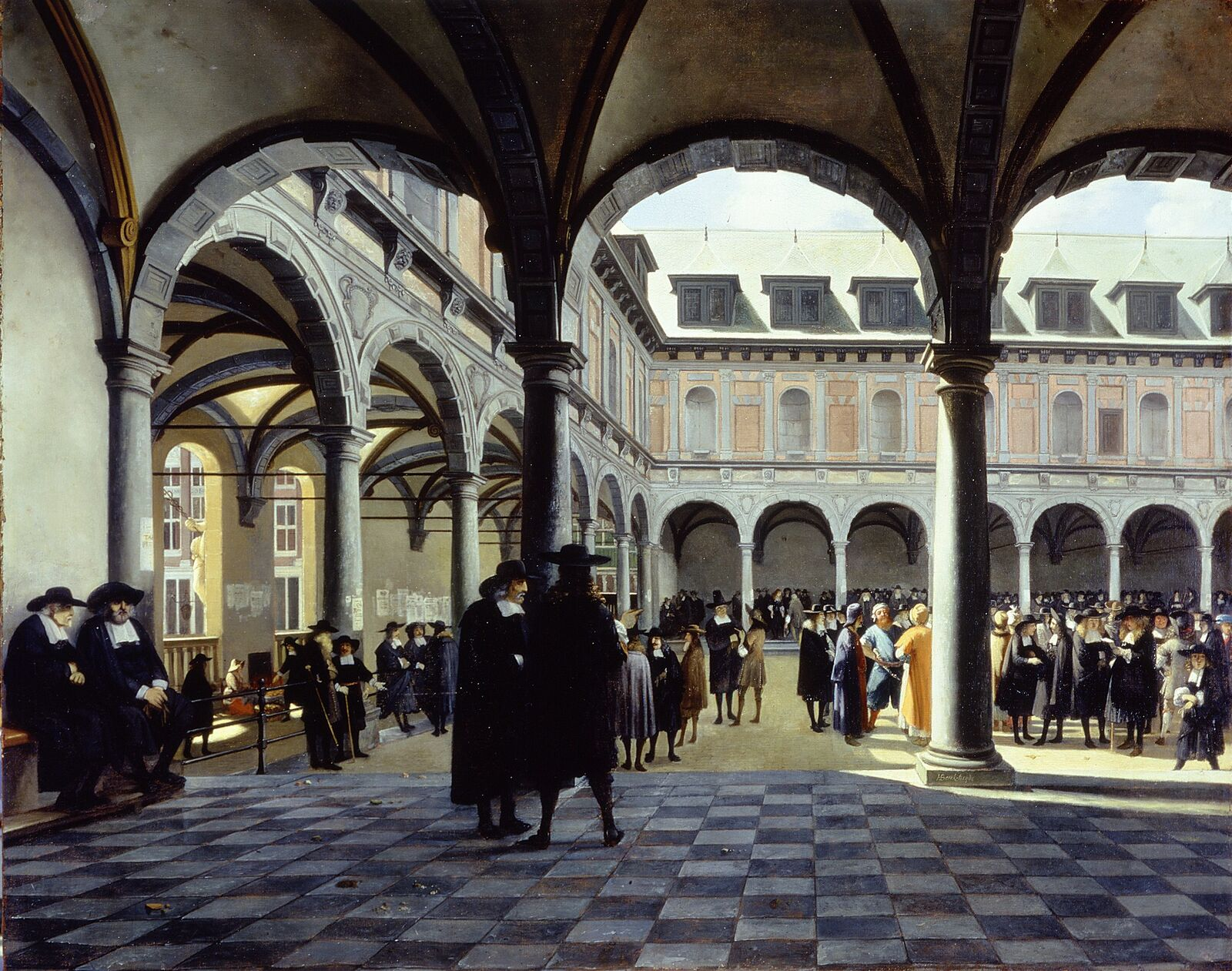
Courtyard of the Amsterdam Stock Exchange, circa 1670

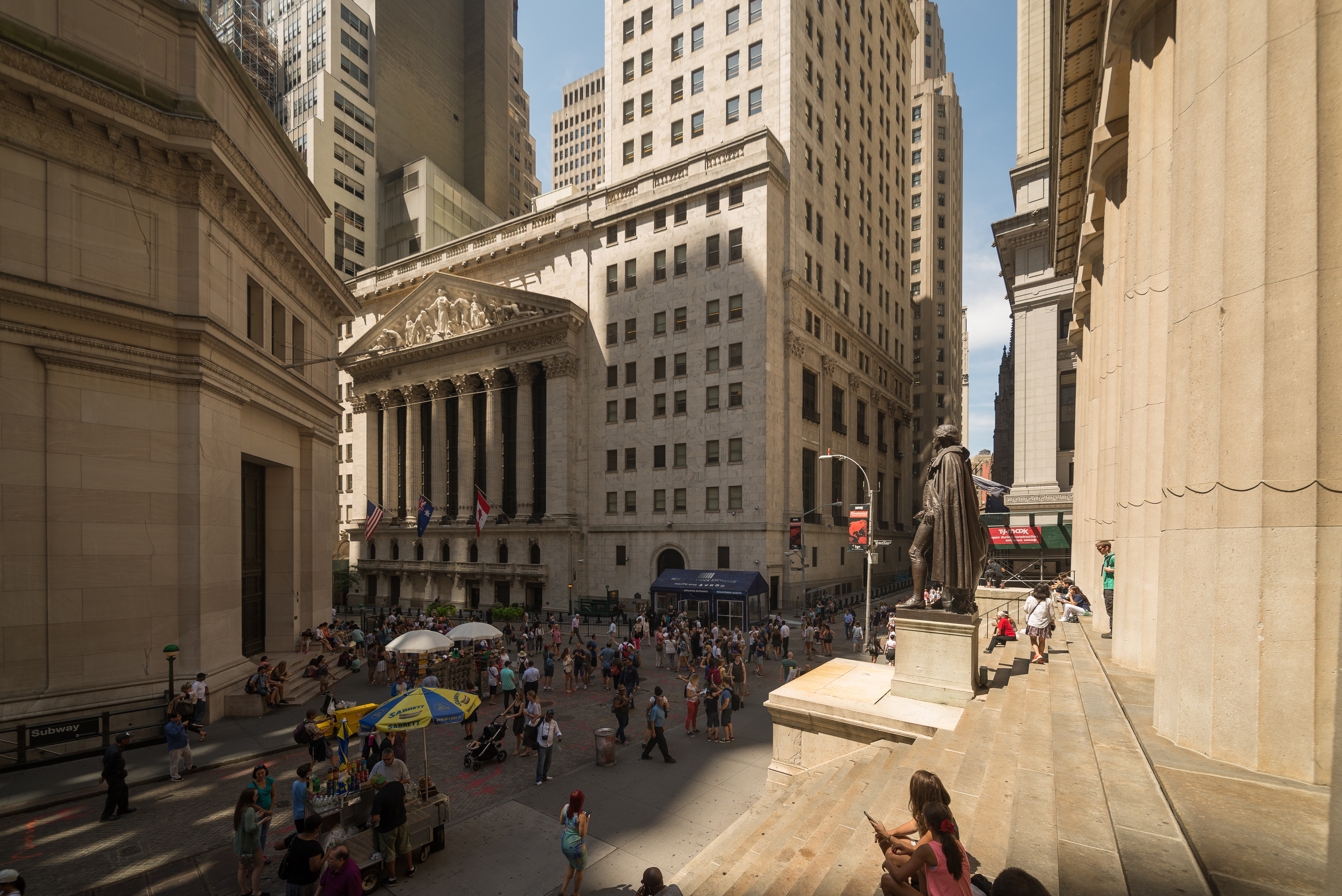
New York Stock Exchange

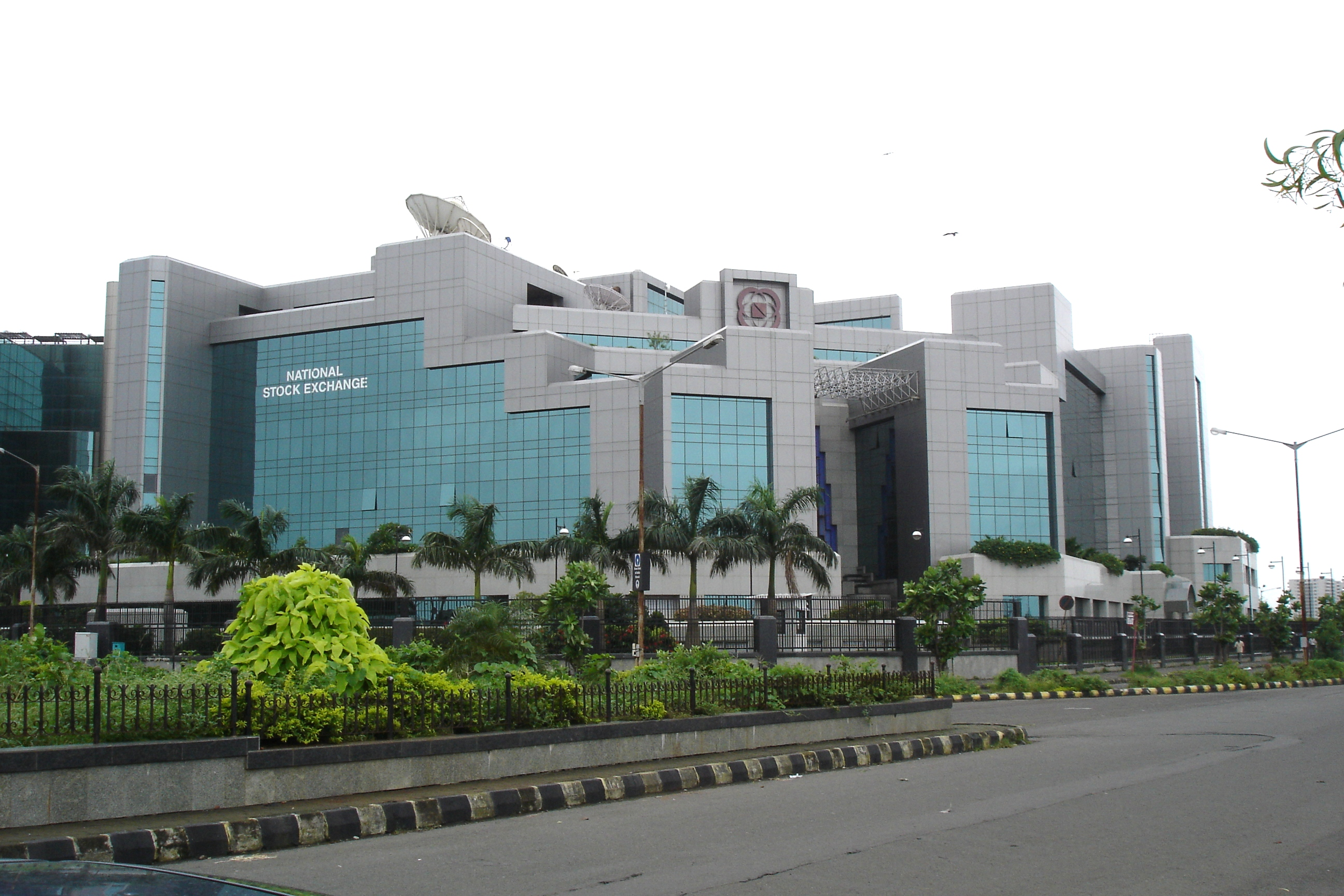
National Stock Exchange of India

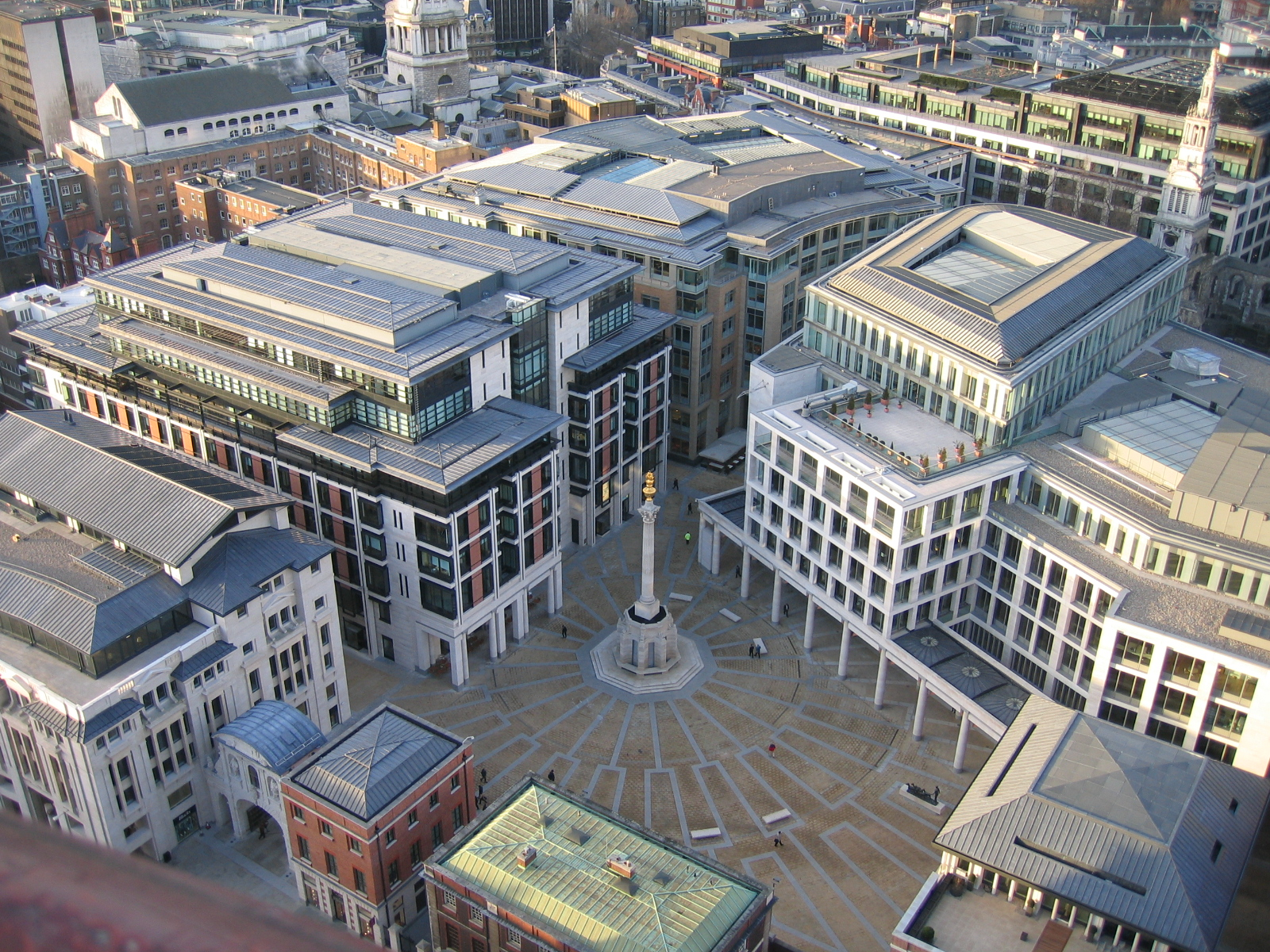
London Stock Exchange

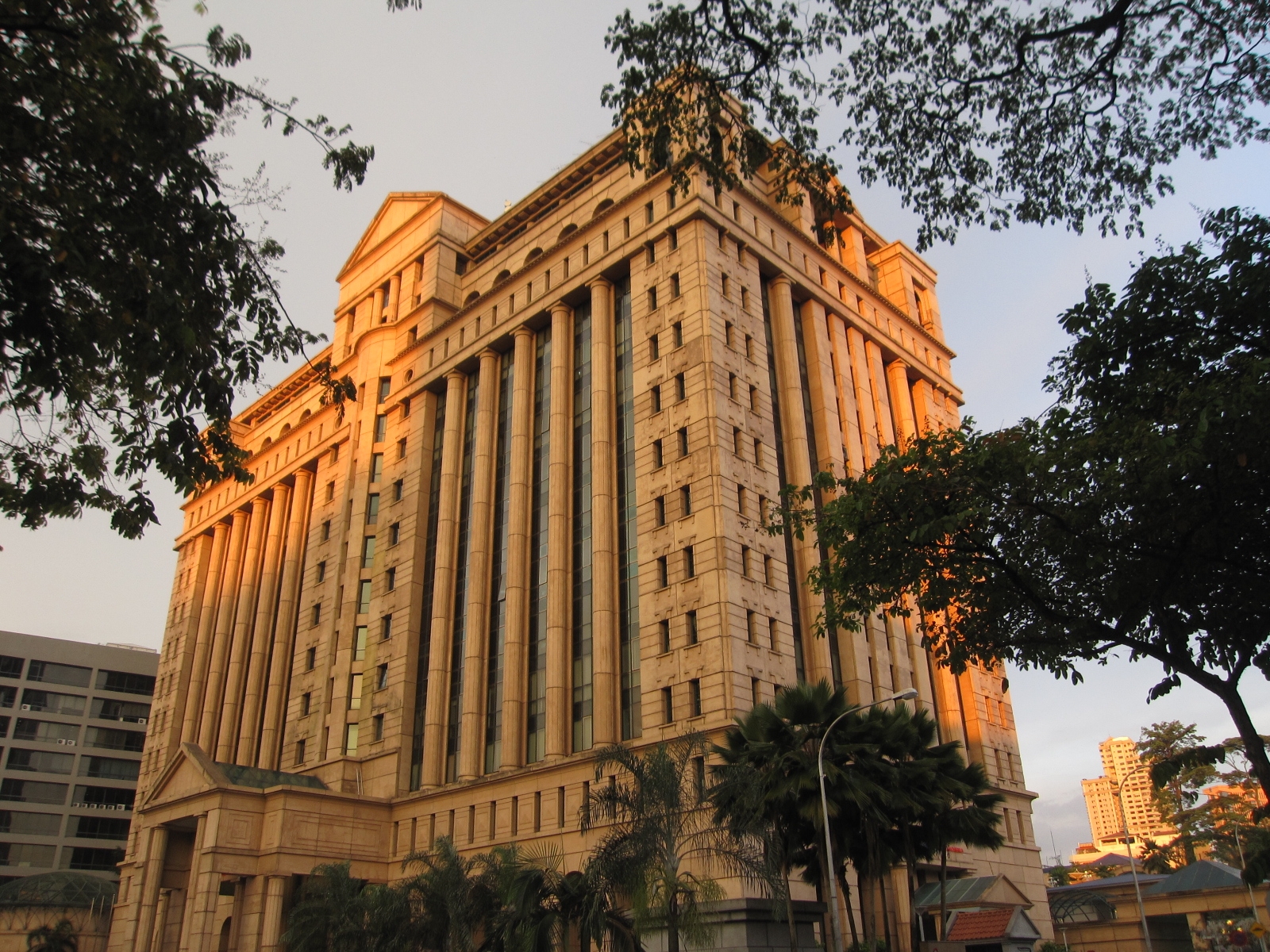
Offices of Bursa Malaysia, Malaysia's national stock exchange

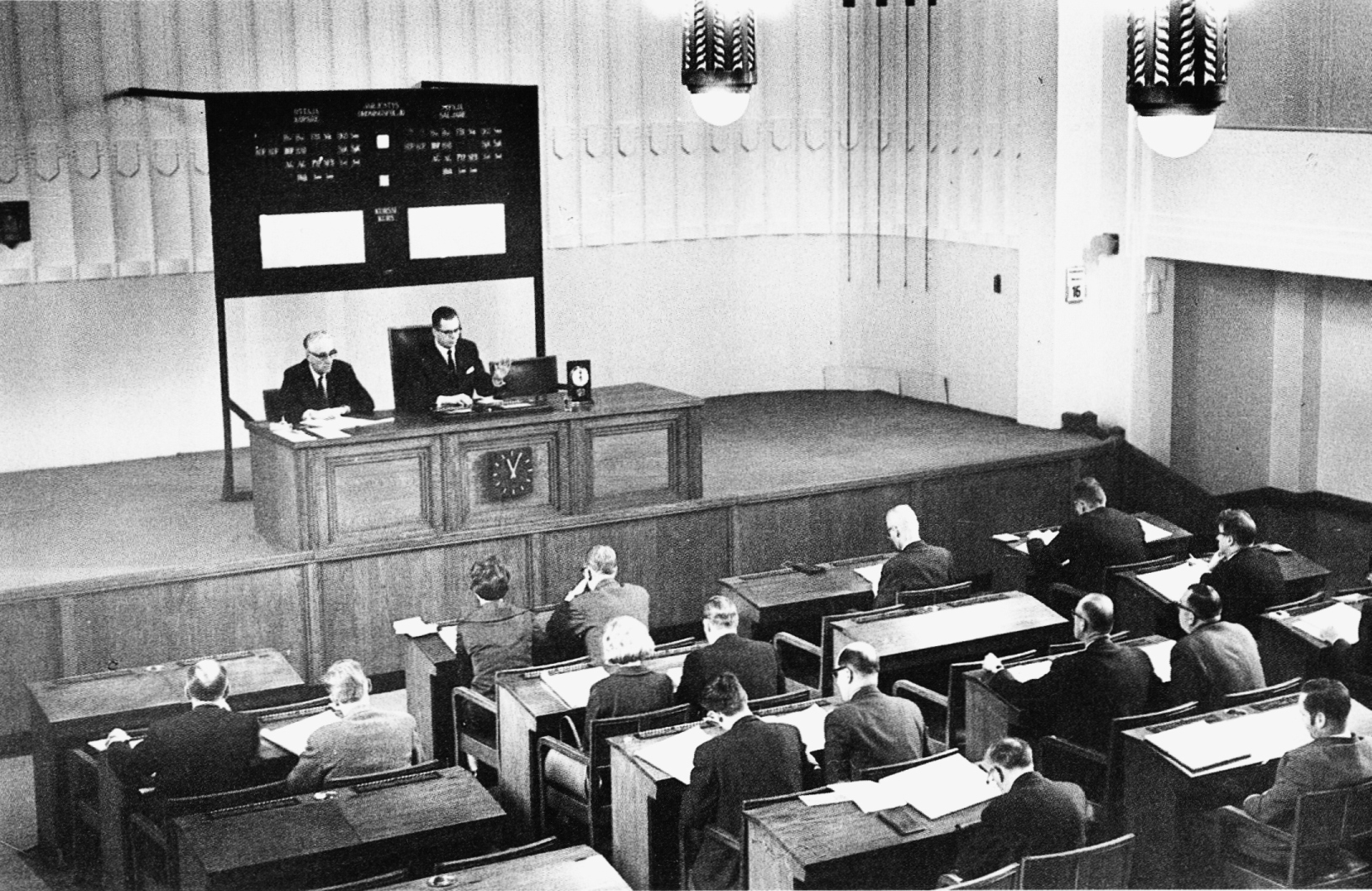
Interior hall of the Helsinki Stock Exchange in Helsinki, Finland, 1965

A stock exchange is an exchange (or bourse) where stockbrokers and traders can buy and sell shares (equity stock), bonds, and other securities. Many large companies have their stocks listed on a stock exchange. This makes the stock more liquid and thus more attractive to many investors. The exchange may also act as a guarantor of settlement. These and other stocks may also be traded "over the counter" (OTC), that is, through a dealer. Some large companies will have their stock listed on more than one exchange in different countries, so as to attract international investors.

Stock exchanges may also cover other types of securities, such as fixed-interest securities (bonds) or (less frequently) derivatives, which are more likely to be traded OTC.

Trade in stock markets means the transfer (in exchange for money) of a stock or security from a seller to a buyer. This requires these two parties to agree on a price. Equities (stocks or shares) confer an ownership interest in a particular company.

Participants in the stock market range from small individual stock investors to larger investors, who can be based anywhere in the world, and may include banks, insurance companies, pension funds and hedge funds. Their buy or sell orders may be executed on their behalf by a stock exchange trader.

Some exchanges are physical locations where transactions are carried out on a trading floor, by a method known as open outcry. This method is used in some stock exchanges and commodities exchanges, and involves traders shouting bid and offer prices. The other type of stock exchange has a network of computers where trades are made electronically. An example of such an exchange is the NASDAQ.

A potential buyer bids a specific price for a stock, and a potential seller asks a specific price for the same stock. Buying or selling at the Market means you will accept any ask price or bid price for the stock. When the bid and ask prices match, a sale takes place, on a first-come, first-served basis if there are multiple bidders at a given price.

The purpose of a stock exchange is to facilitate the exchange of securities between buyers and sellers, thus providing a marketplace. The exchanges provide real-time trading information on the listed securities, facilitating price discovery.

The New York Stock Exchange (NYSE) is a physical exchange, with a hybrid market for placing orders electronically from any location as well as on the trading floor. Orders executed on the trading floor enter by way of exchange members and flow down to a floor broker, who submits the order electronically to the floor trading post for the Designated market maker ("DMM") for that stock to trade the order. The DMM's job is to maintain a two-sided market, making orders to buy and sell the security when there are no other buyers or sellers. If a bid–ask spread exists, no trade immediately takes place – in this case, the DMM may use their own resources (money or stock) to close the difference. Once a trade has been made, the details are reported on the "tape" and sent back to the brokerage firm, which then notifies the investor who placed the order. Computers play an important role, especially for program trading.

The NASDAQ is an electronic exchange, where all of the trading is done over a computer network. The process is similar to the New York Stock Exchange. One or more NASDAQ market makers will always provide a bid and ask the price at which they will always purchase or sell 'their' stock.

The Paris Bourse, now part of Euronext, is an order-driven, electronic stock exchange. It was automated in the late 1980s. Prior to the 1980s, it consisted of an open outcry exchange. Stockbrokers met on the trading floor of the Palais Brongniart. In 1986, the CATS trading system was introduced, and the order matching system was fully automated.

People trading stock will prefer to trade on the most popular exchange since this gives the largest number of potential counter parties (buyers for a seller, sellers for a buyer) and probably the best price. However, there have always been alternatives such as brokers trying to bring parties together to trade outside the exchange. Some third markets that were popular are Instinet, and later Island and Archipelago (the latter two have since been acquired by Nasdaq and NYSE, respectively). One advantage is that this avoids the commissions of the exchange. However, it also has problems such as adverse selection. Financial regulators have probed dark pools.

== Market participant ==
Market participants include individual retail investors, institutional investors (pension funds, insurance companies, mutual funds, index funds, exchange-traded funds, hedge funds, investor groups, banks and various other financial institutions), and also publicly traded corporations trading in their own shares. Robo-advisors, which automate investment for individuals, are also major participants.

=== Stock market participation post-2020 pandemic ===
In 2021, the value of world stock markets increased by 26.5%, reaching US$22.3 trillion. Asia and Oceania accounted for 45%, Europe had 37%, and America had 16%, while Africa had 2% of the global market.

=== Stock market participation factors ===
Factors such as high trading prices, market ratings, information about stock exchange dynamics, and financial institutions can influence individual and corporate participation in stock markets. Additionally, the appeal of stock ownership, driven by the potential for higher returns compared to other financial instruments, plays a crucial role in attracting individuals to invest in the stock market.

Regional and country-specific factors can also impact stock market participation rates. For example, in the United States, stock market participation rates vary widely across states, with regional factors potentially influencing these disparities. It is noted that individual participation costs alone cannot explain such large differences in participation rates from state to state, indicating the presence of other regional factors at play.

Behavioral factors are recognized as significant influences on stock market participation, as evidenced by the low participation rates observed in the Ghanaian stock market.

Factors such as factor endowments, geography, political stability, liberal trade policies, foreign direct investment inflows, and domestic industrial capacity are also identified as important in determining participation.

=== Demographics of market participation in the United States ===
==== Indirect versus direct investment ====
Indirect investment involves owning shares indirectly, such as via a mutual fund or an exchange-traded fund. Direct investment involves direct ownership of shares.

Direct ownership of stock by individuals rose slightly from 17.8% in 1992 to 17.9% in 2007, with the median value of these holdings rising from $14,778 to $17,000. Indirect participation in the form of retirement accounts rose from 39.3% in 1992 to 52.6% in 2007, with the median value of these accounts more than doubling from $22,000 to $45,000 in that time. Rydqvist, Spizman, and Strebulaev attribute the differential growth in direct and indirect holdings to differences in the way each are taxed in the United States. Investments in pension funds and 401ks, the two most common vehicles of indirect participation, are taxed only when funds are withdrawn from the accounts. Conversely, the money used to directly purchase stock is subject to taxation as are any dividends or capital gains they generate for the holder. In this way, the current tax code incentivizes individuals to invest indirectly.

==== Participation by income and wealth strata ====
In 2025, the wealthiest 1% of Americans owned nearly 50% of the stock market. The top 10% own 87.2%, and the bottom half owned 1.1%.

Rates of participation and the value of holdings differ significantly across strata of income. In the bottom quintile of income, 5.5% of households directly own stock and 10.7% hold stocks indirectly in the form of retirement accounts. The top decile of income has a direct participation rate of 47.5% and an indirect participation rate in the form of retirement accounts of 89.6%. The median value of directly owned stock in the bottom quintile of income is $4,000 and is $78,600 in the top decile of income as of 2007. The median value of indirectly held stock in the form of retirement accounts for the same two groups in the same year is $6,300 and $214,800 respectively. Since the Great Recession of 2008 households in the bottom half of the income distribution have lessened their participation rate both directly and indirectly from 53.2% in 2007 to 48.8% in 2013, while over the same period households in the top decile of the income distribution slightly increased participation 91.7% to 92.1%. The mean value of direct and indirect holdings at the bottom half of the income distribution moved slightly downward from $53,800 in 2007 to $53,600 in 2013. In the top decile, mean value of all holdings fell from $982,000 to $969,300 in the same time. The mean value of all stock holdings across the entire income distribution is valued at $269,900 as of 2013.

==== Participation by race and gender ====
The racial composition of stock market ownership shows households headed by whites are nearly four and six times as likely to directly own stocks than households headed by blacks and Hispanics respectively. As of 2011 the national rate of direct participation was 19.6%, for white households the participation rate was 24.5%, for black households it was 6.4% and for Hispanic households it was 4.3%. Indirect participation in the form of 401k ownership shows a similar pattern with a national participation rate of 42.1%, a rate of 46.4% for white households, 31.7% for black households, and 25.8% for Hispanic households. Households headed by married couples participated at rates above the national averages with 25.6% participating directly and 53.4% participating indirectly through a retirement account. 14.7% of households headed by men participated in the market directly and 33.4% owned stock through a retirement account. 12.6% of female-headed households directly owned stock and 28.7% owned stock indirectly.

==== Determinants and possible explanations of stock market participation ====
A 2003 paper by Annette Vissing-Jørgensen attempts to explain disproportionate rates of participation along wealth and income groups as a function of fixed costs associated with investing. Her research concludes that a fixed cost of $200 per year is sufficient to explain why nearly half of all U.S. households do not participate in the market. Participation rates have been shown to strongly correlate with education levels, promoting the hypothesis that information and transaction costs of market participation are better absorbed by more educated households. Studies using Dutch household survey data also found that low financial literacy was associated with a lower likelihood of holding stocks. Behavioral economists Harrison Hong, Jeffrey Kubik and Jeremy Stein suggest that sociability and participation rates of communities have a statistically significant impact on an individual's decision to participate in the market. Their research indicates that social individuals living in states with higher than average participation rates are 5% more likely to participate than individuals that do not share those characteristics. This phenomenon also explained in cost terms. Knowledge of market functioning diffuses through communities and consequently lowers transaction costs associated with investing.

== History ==
In 12th-century France, the courtiers de change were concerned with managing and regulating the debts of agricultural communities on behalf of the banks. Because these men also traded with debts, they could be called the first brokers. The Italian historian Lodovico Guicciardini described how, in late 13th-century Bruges, commodity traders gathered outdoors at a market square containing an inn owned by a family called Van der Beurze, and in 1409 they became the "Brugse Beurse", institutionalizing what had been, until then, an informal meeting. The idea quickly spread around Flanders and neighboring countries and "Beurzen" soon opened in Ghent and Rotterdam. International traders, and specially the Italian bankers, present in Bruges since the early 13th-century, took back the word in their countries to define the place of a stock market exchange: first the Italians (borsa), but soon also the French (bourse), the Germans (börse), Russians (birža), Czechs (burza), Swedes (börs), Danes and Norwegians (børs). In most languages, the word coincides with that for money bag, dating back to the Latin "bursa", from which also derives the name of the Van der Beurse family.

In the middle of the 13th century, Venetian bankers began to trade in government securities. In 1351 the Venetian government outlawed spreading rumors intended to lower the price of government funds. Bankers in Pisa, Verona, Genoa and Florence also began trading in government securities during the 14th century. This was only possible because these were independent city-states not ruled by a duke but a council of influential citizens. Italian companies were also the first to issue shares. Companies in England and the Low Countries followed in the 16th century. Around this time, a joint stock company—one whose stock is owned jointly by the shareholders—emerged and became important for the colonization of what Europeans called the "New World".

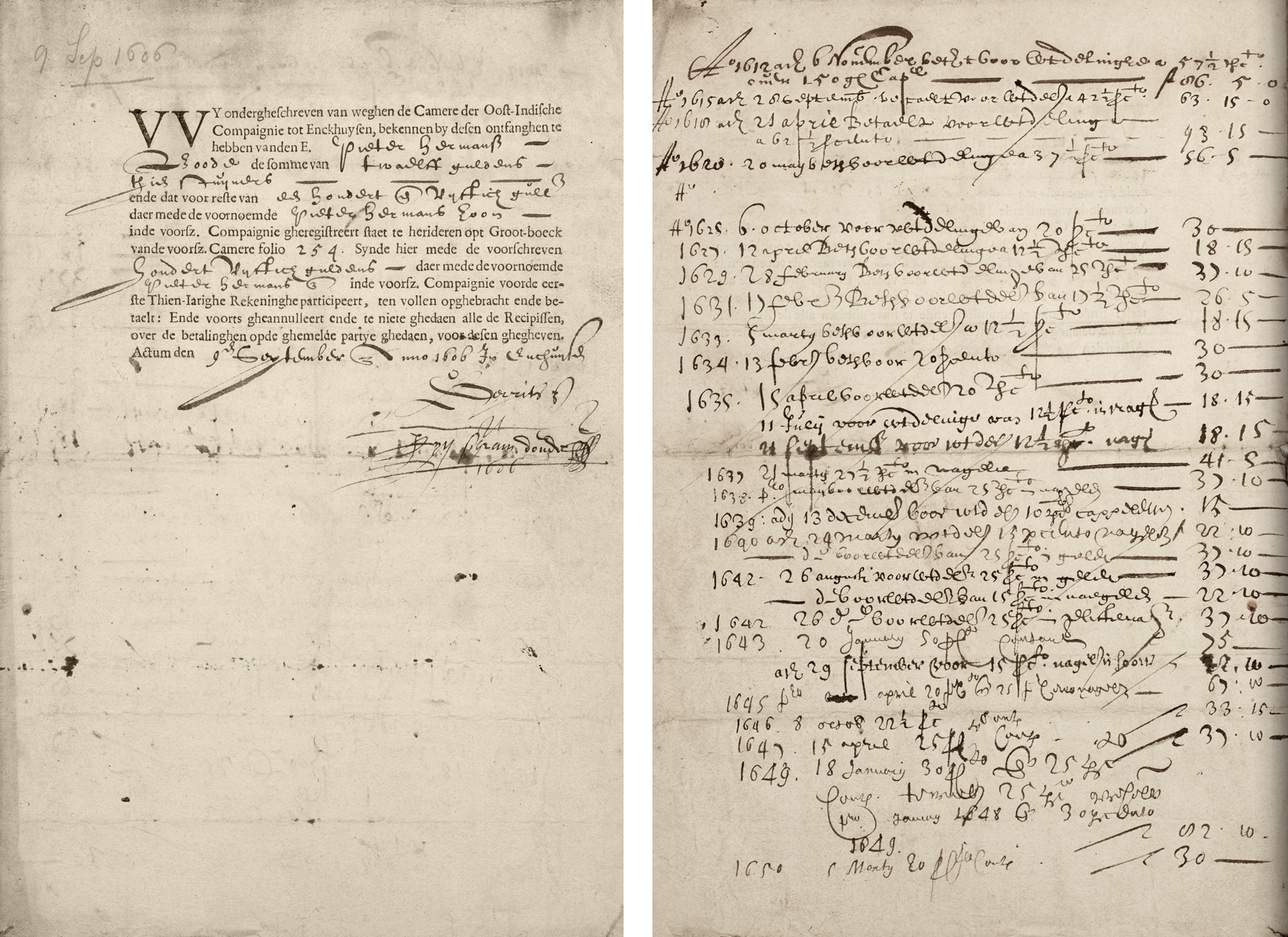
One of the oldest known stock certificates, issued by the VOC chamber of Enkhuizen, dated September 9, 1606

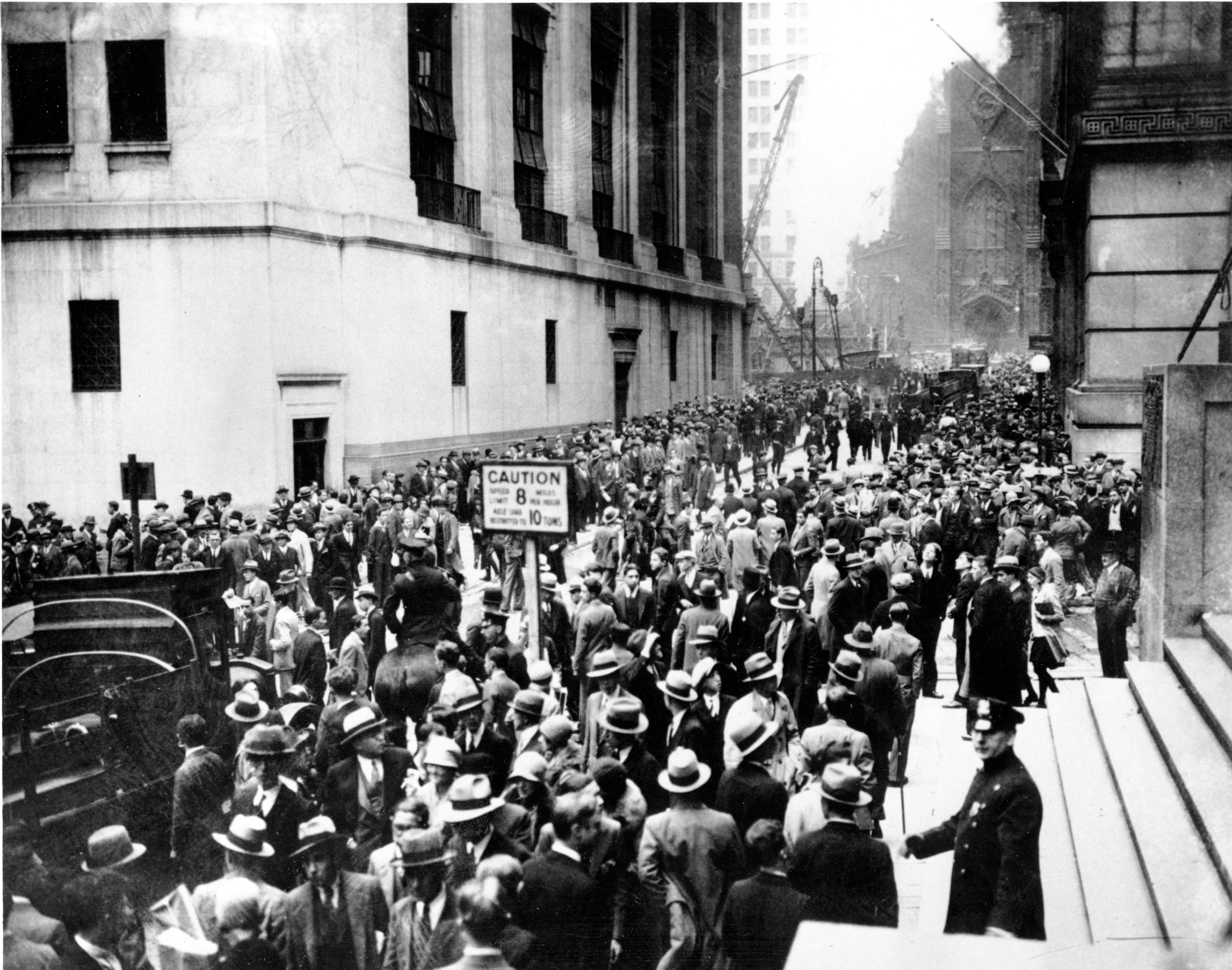
Crowd gathering on Wall Street (New York City) after the 1929 crash, one of the worst stock market crashes in history

There are now stock markets in virtually every developed and most developing countries, with the world's largest markets being in the United States, United Kingdom, Japan, India, China, Canada, Germany, France, South Korea and the Netherlands.

== Importance ==
Even in the days before perestroika, socialism was never a monolith. Within the Communist countries, the spectrum of socialism ranged from the quasi-market, quasi-syndicalist system of Yugoslavia to the centralized totalitarianism of neighboring Albania. One time I asked Professor von Mises, the great expert on the economics of socialism, at what point on this spectrum of statism would he designate a country as "socialist" or not. At that time, I wasn't sure that any definite criterion existed to make that sort of clear-cut judgment. And so I was pleasantly surprised at the clarity and decisiveness of Mises's answer. "A stock market," he answered promptly. "A stock market is crucial to the existence of capitalism and private property. For it means that there is a functioning market in the exchange of private titles to the means of production. There can be no genuine private ownership of capital without a stock market: there can be no true socialism if such a market is allowed to exist."

— Murray Rothbard, in "Making Economic Sense" (2006)

=== Function and purpose ===
The stock market is one of the most important ways for companies to raise money, along with debt markets which are generally more imposing but do not trade publicly. This allows businesses to be publicly traded, and raise additional financial capital for expansion by selling shares of ownership of the company in a public market. The liquidity that an exchange affords the investors enables their holders to quickly and easily sell securities. This is an attractive feature of investing in stocks, compared to other less liquid investments such as property and other immoveable assets.

the stock market is one of the economic indicators of a country's economic strength and development. Central banks tend to keep an eye on the control and behavior of the stock market and, in general, on the smooth operation of financial system functions. Economic stability is one of the central bank mandates.

Exchanges also act as the clearinghouse for each transaction, meaning that they collect and deliver the shares, and guarantee payment to the seller of a security. This eliminates the risk to an individual buyer or seller that the counterparty could default on the transaction.

The smooth functioning of all these activities facilitates economic growth in that lower costs and enterprise risks promote the production of goods and services as well as possibly employment. In this way the financial system is assumed to contribute to increased prosperity, although some controversy exists as to whether the optimal financial system is bank-based or market-based.

Events such as the 2008 financial crisis have prompted a heightened degree of scrutiny of the impact of the structure of stock markets (called market microstructure), in particular to the stability of the financial system and the transmission of systemic risk.

=== Relation to the modern financial system ===
A transformation is the move to electronic trading to replace human trading of listed securities.

=== Behavior of stock prices ===
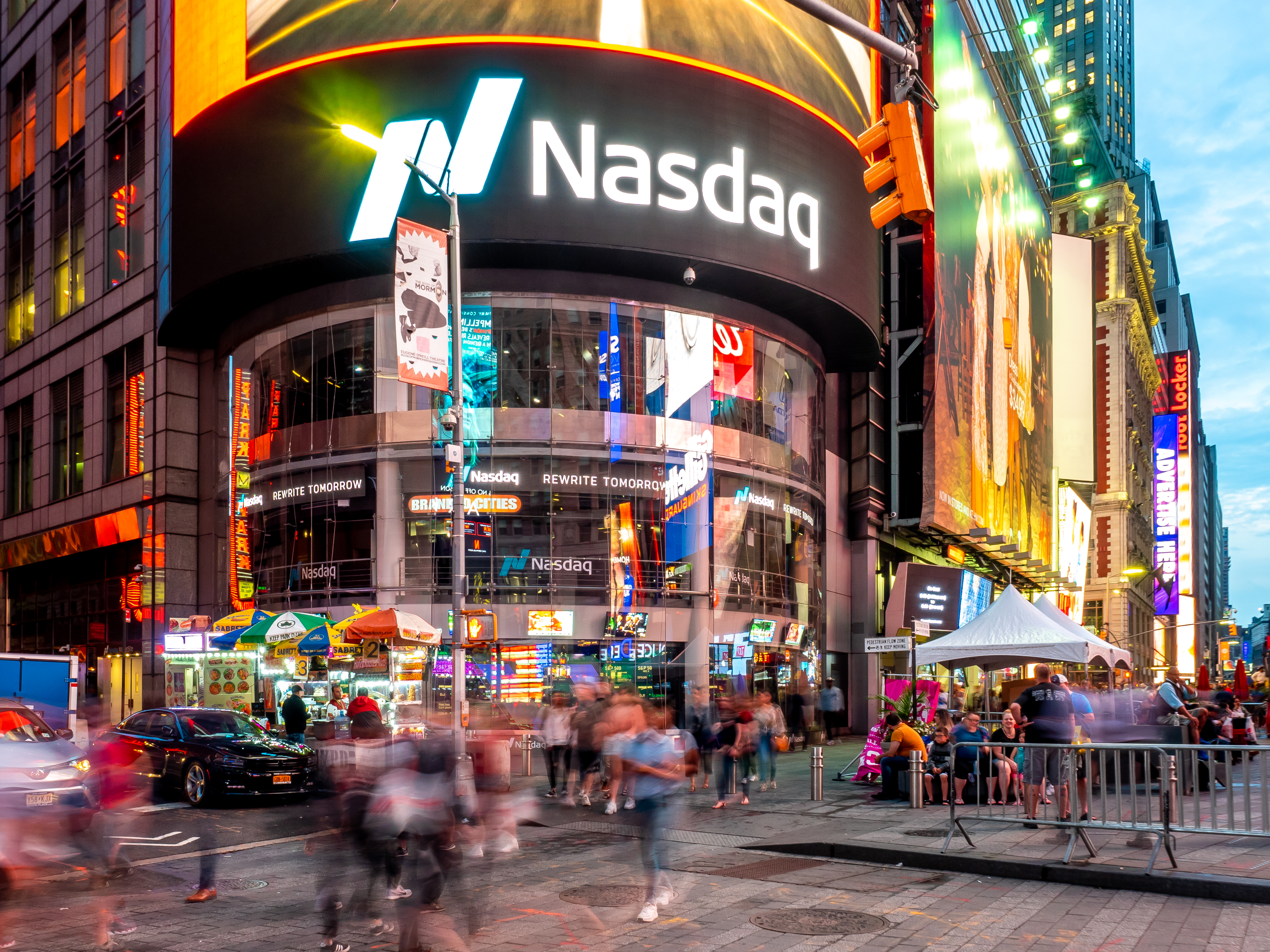
NASDAQ in Times Square, New York City

Changes in stock prices are mostly caused by external factors such as socioeconomic conditions, inflation, exchange rates. Intellectual capital does not affect a company stock's current earnings. Intellectual capital contributes to a stock's return growth.

The efficient-market hypothesis (EMH) is a hypothesis in financial economics that states that asset prices reflect all available information at the current time.

The 'hard' efficient-market hypothesis does not explain the cause of events such as the crash in 1987, when the Dow Jones Industrial Average plummeted 22.6 percent—the largest-ever one-day fall in the United States.

This event demonstrated that share prices can fall dramatically even though no generally agreed upon definite cause has been found: a thorough search failed to detect any 'reasonable' development that might have accounted for the crash. (Such events are predicted to occur strictly by randomness, although very rarely.) It seems also to be true more generally that many price movements (beyond those which are predicted to occur 'randomly') are not occasioned by new information; a study of the fifty largest one-day share price movements in the United States in the post-war period seems to confirm this.

A 'soft' EMH has emerged which does not require that prices remain at or near equilibrium, but only that market participants cannot systematically profit from any momentary 'market anomaly'. Moreover, while EMH predicts that all price movement (in the absence of change in fundamental information) is random (i.e. non-trending), many studies have shown a marked tendency for the stock market to trend over time periods of weeks or longer. Various explanations for such large and apparently non-random price movements have been promulgated. For instance, some research has shown that changes in estimated risk, and the use of certain strategies, such as stop-loss limits and value at risk limits, theoretically could cause financial markets to overreact. But the best explanation seems to be that the distribution of stock market prices is non-Gaussian (in which case EMH, in any of its current forms, would not be strictly applicable).

Other research has shown that psychological factors may result in exaggerated (statistically anomalous) stock price movements (contrary to EMH which assumes such behaviors 'cancel out'). Psychological research has demonstrated that people are predisposed to 'seeing' patterns, and often will perceive a pattern in what is, in fact, just noise, e.g. seeing familiar shapes in clouds or ink blots. In the present context, this means that a succession of good news items about a company may lead investors to overreact positively, driving the price up. A period of good returns also boosts the investors' self-confidence, reducing their (psychological) risk threshold.

Another phenomenon—also from psychology—that works against an objective assessment is group thinking. As social animals, it is not easy to stick to an opinion that differs markedly from that of a majority of the group. An example with which one may be familiar is the reluctance to enter a restaurant that is empty; people generally prefer to have their opinion validated by those of others in the group.

In one paper the authors draw an analogy with gambling. In normal times the market behaves like a game of roulette; the probabilities are known and largely independent of the investment decisions of the different players. In times of market stress, however, the game becomes more like poker (herding behavior takes over). The players now must give heavy weight to the psychology of other investors and how they are likely to react psychologically.

Stock markets play an essential role in growing industries that ultimately affect the economy through transferring available funds from units that have excess funds (savings) to those who are suffering from funds deficit (borrowings) (Padhi and Naik, 2012). In other words, capital markets facilitate funds movement between the above-mentioned units. This process leads to the enhancement of available financial resources which in turn affects the economic growth positively.

Economic and financial theories argue that stock prices are affected by macroeconomic trends. Macroeconomic trends include such as changes in GDP, unemployment rates, national income, price indices, output, consumption, unemployment, inflation, saving, investment, energy, international trade, immigration, productivity, aging populations, innovations, international finance. increasing corporate profit, increasing profit margins, higher concentration of business, lower company income, less vigorous activity, less progress, lower investment rates, lower productivity growth, less employee share of corporate revenues, decreasing worker to beneficiary ratio (year 1960 5:1, year 2009 3:1, year 2030 2.2:1), and the increasing female to male ratio of college graduates.

=== Irrational behavior ===
Sometimes, the market seems to react irrationally to economic or financial news, even if that news is likely to have no real effect on the fundamental value of securities itself. However, this market behaviour may be more apparent than real, since often such news was anticipated, and a counter reaction may occur if the news is better (or worse) than expected. Therefore, the stock market may be swayed in either direction by press releases, rumors, euphoria and mass panic.

Over the short term, stocks and other securities can be battered or bought by any number of fast market-changing events, making the stock market behavior difficult to predict. Emotions can drive prices up and down, people are generally not as rational as they think, and the reasons for buying and selling are generally accepted.

Behaviorists argue that investors often behave irrationally when making investment decisions thereby incorrectly pricing securities, which causes market inefficiencies, which, in turn, are opportunities to make money. However, the whole notion of EMH is that these non-rational reactions to information cancel out, leaving the prices of stocks rationally determined.

=== Crashes ===
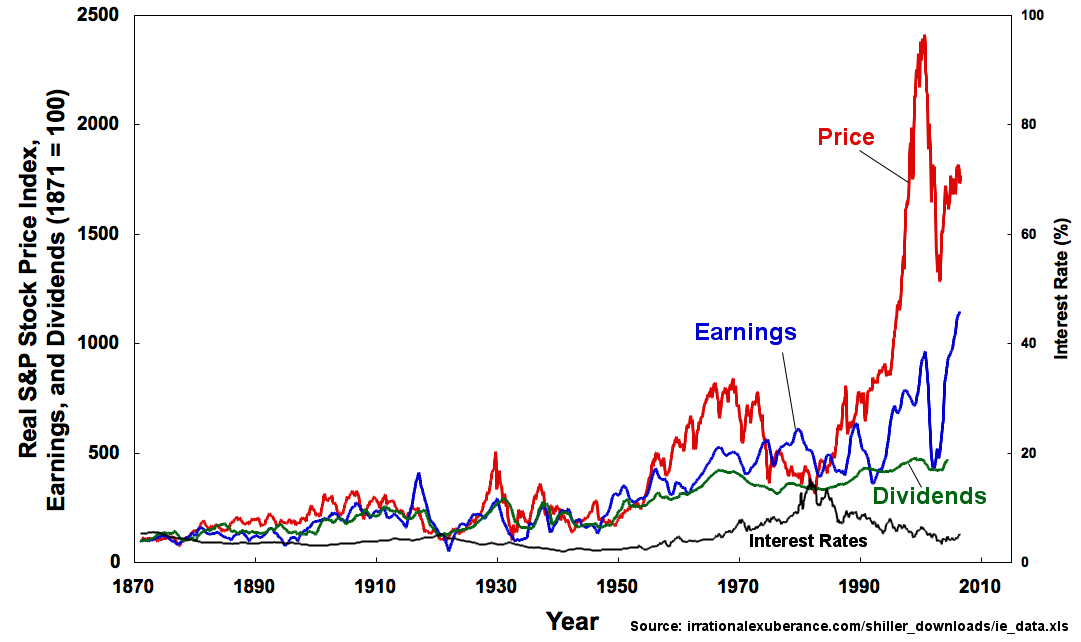
Robert Shiller's plot of the S&P Composite Real Price Index, Earnings, Dividends, and Interest Rates, from Irrational Exuberance, 2d ed. In the preface to this edition, Shiller warns, "The stock market has not come down to historical levels: the price-earnings ratio as I define it in this book is still, at this writing [2005], in the mid-20s, far higher than the historical average... People still place too much confidence in the markets and have too strong a belief that paying attention to the gyrations in their investments will someday make them rich, and so they do not make conservative preparations for possible bad outcomes."

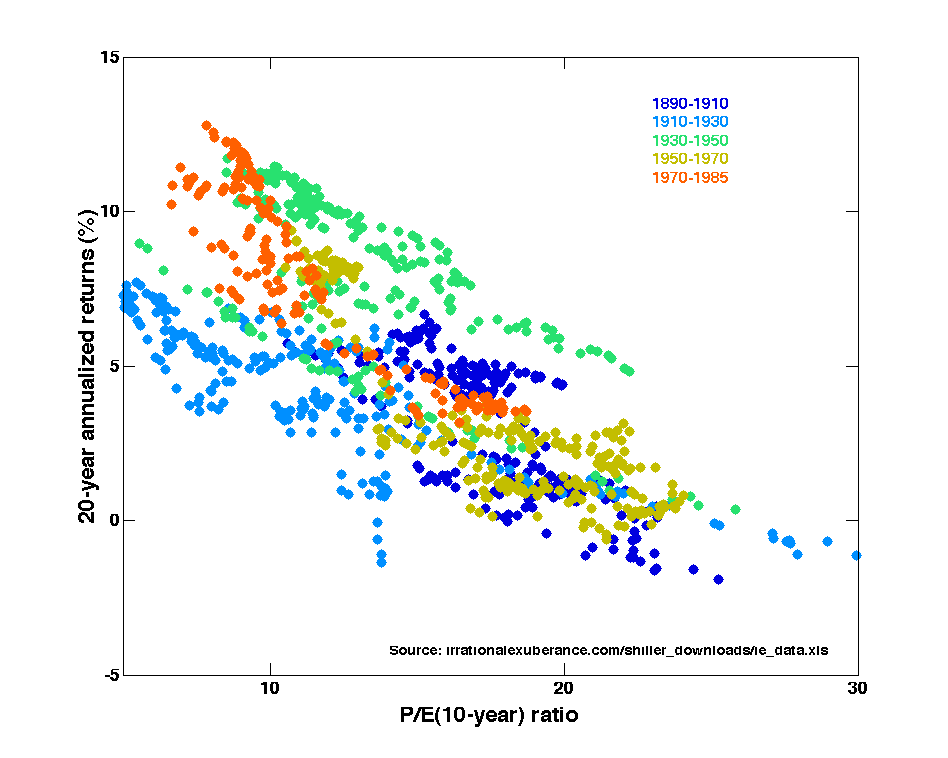
Price-Earnings ratios as a predictor of twenty-year returns based upon the plot by Robert Shiller (Figure 10.1). The horizontal axis shows the real price-earnings ratio of the S&P Composite Stock Price Index as computed in Irrational Exuberance (inflation adjusted price divided by the prior ten-year mean of inflation-adjusted earnings). The vertical axis shows the geometric average real annual return on investing in the S&P Composite Stock Price Index, reinvesting dividends, and selling twenty years later. Data from different twenty-year periods is color-coded as shown in the key. Shiller states that this plot "confirms that long-term investors—investors who commit their money to an investment for ten full years—did do well when prices were low relative to earnings at the beginning of the ten years. Long-term investors would be well advised, individually, to lower their exposure to the stock market when it is high, as it has been recently, and get into the market when it is low."

A stock market crash is often defined as a sharp dip in share prices of stocks listed on the stock exchanges. In parallel with various economic factors, a reason for stock market crashes is also due to panic and investing public's loss of confidence. Often, stock market crashes end speculative economic bubbles.

There have been famous stock market crashes that have ended in the loss of billions of dollars and wealth destruction on a massive scale. An increasing number of people are involved in the stock market, especially since the social security and retirement plans are being increasingly privatized and linked to stocks and bonds and other elements of the market. There have been a number of famous stock market crashes like the Wall Street Crash of 1929, the stock market crash of 1973–4, Black Monday of 1987, the dot-com bubble of 2000, and the 2008 financial crisis.

=== 1929 ===
One of the most famous stock market crashes started October 24, 1929, on Black Thursday. The Dow Jones Industrial Average lost 50% during this stock market crash. It was the beginning of the Great Depression.

=== 1987 ===
Another famous crash took place on October 19, 1987 – Black Monday. The crash began in Hong Kong and quickly spread around the world.

By the end of October, stock markets in Hong Kong had fallen 45.5%, Australia 41.8%, Spain 31%, the United Kingdom 26.4%, the United States 22.68%, and Canada 22.5%. Black Monday itself was the largest one-day percentage decline in stock market history – the Dow Jones fell by 22.6% in a day. The names "Black Monday" and "Black Tuesday" are also used for October 28–29, 1929, which followed Terrible Thursday—the starting day of the stock market crash in 1929.

The crash in 1987 raised some puzzles – main news and events did not predict the catastrophe and visible reasons for the collapse were not identified. This event raised questions about many important assumptions of modern economics, namely, the theory of rational human conduct, the theory of market equilibrium and the efficient-market hypothesis. For some time after the crash, trading in stock exchanges worldwide was halted, since the exchange computers did not perform well owing to enormous quantity of trades being received at one time. This halt in trading allowed the Federal Reserve System and central banks of other countries to take measures to control the spreading of a financial crisis. In the United States the SEC introduced several new measures of control into the stock market in an attempt to prevent a re-occurrence of the events of Black Monday.

=== 2007–2009 ===
This marked the beginning of the Great Recession. Starting in 2007 and lasting through 2009, financial markets experienced one of the sharpest declines in decades. It was more widespread than just the stock market as well. The housing market, lending market, and even global trade experienced unimaginable decline. Sub-prime lending led to the housing bubble bursting and was made famous by movies like The Big Short where those holding large mortgages were unwittingly falling prey to lenders. This saw banks and major financial institutions completely fail in many cases and took major government intervention to remedy during the period. From October 2007 to March 2009, the S&P 500 fell 57% and wouldn't recover to its 2007 levels until April 2013.

=== 2020 ===
The 2020 stock market crash was a major and sudden global stock market crash that began on February 20, 2020, and ended on April 7. This market crash was due to the sudden outbreak of the global pandemic, COVID-19. The crash ended with a new deal that had a positive impact on the market.

=== Circuit breakers ===
Since the early 1990s, many of the largest exchanges have adopted electronic 'matching engines' to bring together buyers and sellers, replacing the open outcry system. Electronic trading now accounts for the majority of trading in many developed countries. Computer systems were upgraded in the stock exchanges to handle larger trading volumes in a more accurate and controlled manner. The SEC modified the margin requirements in an attempt to lower the volatility of common stocks, stock options and the futures market. The New York Stock Exchange and the Chicago Mercantile Exchange introduced the concept of a circuit breaker. The circuit breaker halts trading if the Dow falls a prescribed number of points for a prescribed amount of time. In February 2012, the Investment Industry Regulatory Organization of Canada (IIROC) introduced single-stock circuit breakers.

New York Stock Exchange (NYSE) circuit breakers
| % drop in S&P 500 Index | Trading Halt |
|---|---|
| 7% | Trading will halt for at least 15 minutes, only if drop occurs before 3:25 p.m |
| 13% | Trading will halt for at least 15 minutes, only if drop occurs before 3:25 p.m |
| 20% | Trading will stop for the day. |

=== Automated trading ===
In 2014, more than 75 percent of the stock shares traded on United States exchanges (including the New York Stock Exchange and NASDAQ) originated from automated trading system orders. Automated trading, or high-frequency trading, causes regulatory concerns as a contributor to market fragility.

== Stock market index ==
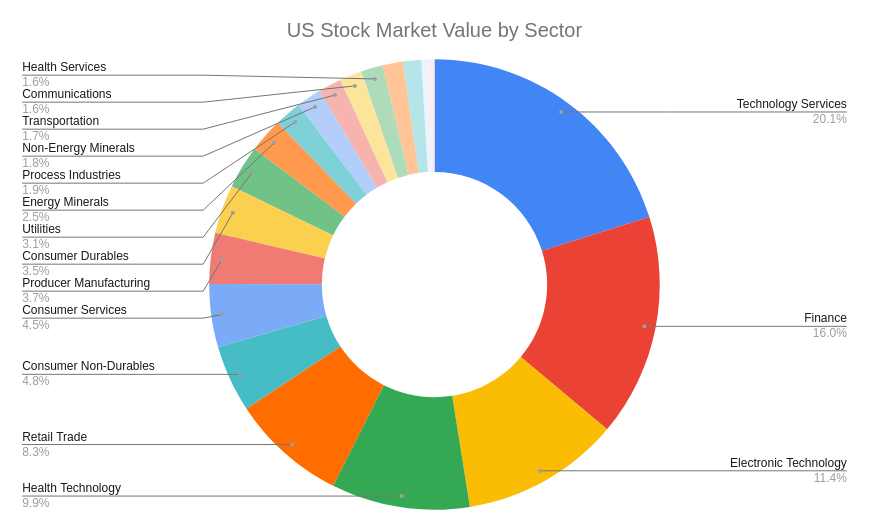
US Stock Market Value by Sector

The movements of the prices in global, regional or local markets are captured in price indices called stock market indices, of which there are many, e.g. the S&P, the FTSE, the Euronext indices and the NIFTY & SENSEX of India. Such indices are usually market capitalization weighted, with the weights reflecting the contribution of the stock to the index. The constituents of the index are reviewed frequently to include/exclude stocks in order to reflect the changing business environment.

== Derivative instruments ==
Financial innovation has brought many new financial instruments whose pay-offs or values depend on the prices of stocks. Some examples are exchange-traded funds (ETFs), stock index and stock options, equity swaps, single-stock futures, and stock index futures. These last two may be traded on futures exchanges (which are distinct from stock exchanges—their history traces back to commodity futures exchanges), or traded over-the-counter. As all of these products are only derived from stocks, they are sometimes considered to be traded in a (hypothetical) derivatives market, rather than the (hypothetical) stock market.

== Leveraged strategies ==
Stock that a trader does not actually own may be traded using short selling; margin buying may be used to purchase stock with borrowed funds; or, derivatives may be used to control large blocks of stocks for a much smaller amount of money than would be required by outright purchase or sales.

=== Short selling ===
In short selling, the trader borrows stock (usually from his brokerage which holds its clients shares or its own shares on account to lend to short sellers) then sells it on the market, betting that the price will fall. The trader eventually buys back the stock, making money if the price fell in the meantime and losing money if it rose. Exiting a short position by buying back the stock is called "covering". This strategy may also be used by unscrupulous traders in illiquid or thinly traded markets to artificially lower the price of a stock. Hence most markets either prevent short selling or place restrictions on when and how a short sale can occur. The practice of naked shorting is illegal in most (but not all) stock markets.

=== Margin buying ===
In margin buying, the trader borrows money (at interest) to buy a stock and hopes for it to rise. Most industrialized countries have regulations that require that if the borrowing is based on collateral from other stocks the trader owns outright, it can be a maximum of a certain percentage of those other stocks' value. In the United States, the margin requirements have been 50% for many years (that is, if you want to make a $1000 investment, you need to put up $500, and there is often a maintenance margin below the $500).

A margin call is made if the total value of the investor's account cannot support the loss of the trade. (Upon a decline in the value of the margined securities additional funds may be required to maintain the account's equity, and with or without notice the margined security or any others within the account may be sold by the brokerage to protect its loan position. The investor is responsible for any shortfall following such forced sales.)

Regulation of margin requirements (by the Federal Reserve) was implemented after the Crash of 1929. Before that, speculators typically only needed to put up as little as 10 percent (or even less) of the total investment represented by the stocks purchased. Other rules may include the prohibition of freeriding: putting in an order to buy stocks without paying initially (there is normally a three-day grace period for delivery of the stock), but then selling them (before the three-days are up) and using part of the proceeds to make the original payment (assuming that the value of the stocks has not declined in the interim).

== Types of financial markets ==
Financial markets can be divided into different subtypes:

=== For the assets transferred ===
- Money market : It is traded with money or financial assets with short-term maturity and high liquidity, generally assets with a term of less than one year.
- Capital market : Financial assets with medium and long-term maturity are traded, which are basic for carrying out certain investment processes.

=== Depending on its structure ===
- Organized market
- Non-organized markets denominated in English (Over The Counter or OTC).

=== According to the negotiation phase of financial assets ===
- Primary market : Financial assets are created. In this market, assets are transmitted directly by their issuer.
- Secondary market : Only existing financial assets are exchanged, which were issued at a previous time. This market allows holders of financial assets to sell instruments that were already issued in the primary market (or that had already been transmitted in the secondary market) and that are in their possession, or to buy other financial assets.

=== According to the geographical perspective ===
- National markets. The currency in which the financial assets are denominated and the residence of those involved is national.
- International markets. The markets situated outside a country's geographical area.

=== According to the type of asset traded ===
- Traditional market. In which financial assets such as demand deposits, stocks or bonds are traded.
- Alternative market. In which alternative financial assets are traded such as portfolio investments, promissory notes, factoring, real estate (e.g. through fiduciary rights), in private equity funds, venture capital funds, hedge funds, investment projects (e.g. infrastructure, cinema, etc.) among many others.

=== Other markets ===
- Commodity markets, which allow the trading of commodities.
- Derivatives markets, which provide instruments for managing financial risk.
- Forward markets, which provide standardized forward contracts to trade products at a future date.
- Insurance markets, which allows the redistribution of varied risks.
- Foreign exchange market, which allows the exchange of foreign currencies.

=== Stock market and foreign exchange market ===
While the stock market is the marketplace for buying and selling company stocks, the foreign exchange market, also known as forex or FX, is the global marketplace for the purchase and sale of national currencies. It serves several functions, including facilitating currency conversions, managing foreign exchange risk through futures and forwards, and providing a platform for speculative investors to earn a profit on FX trading. The market includes various types of products, such as the spot market, futures market, forward market, swap market, and options market. For example, the spot market involves the immediate buying and selling of currencies, while the forward market allows for the buying and selling of currencies at an agreed exchange rate, with the actual exchange taking place at a future delivery date. The foreign exchange market is needed for facilitating global trade, including investments, the exchange of goods and services, and financial transactions, and it is considered one of the largest markets in the global economy.

=== Electronic trading market ===
The electronic trading market refers to the digital marketplace where financial instruments such as stocks, bonds, currencies, commodities, and derivatives are bought and sold through online platforms. This market operates via electronic trading platforms, also known as online trading platforms, which are software applications that enable the trading of financial products over a network, typically through a financial intermediary. Platforms, such as eToro, Plus500, Robinhood, and AvaTrade serve as a digital medium for trading financial instruments and make financial markets more accessible, allowing individual investors to participate in trading without the need for traditional brokers or substantial capital. They also provide features such as real-time market data, stock price analysis, research reports, and news updates, which support decision-making in trading activities.

These platforms often incorporate systems, such as the Martingale Trading System, used in forex trading. Additionally, online trading has evolved to include mobile trading apps, enabling transactions to be conducted remotely via smartphones.

== Investment strategies ==
Many strategies can be classified as either fundamental analysis or technical analysis. Fundamental analysis refers to analyzing companies by their financial statements found in SEC filings, business trends, and general economic conditions. Technical analysis studies price actions in markets through the use of charts and quantitative techniques to attempt to forecast price trends based on historical performance, regardless of the company's financial prospects. One example of a technical strategy is the Trend following method, used by John W. Henry and Ed Seykota, which uses price patterns and is also rooted in risk management and diversification.

Additionally, many choose to invest via passive index funds. In this method, one holds a portfolio of the entire stock market or some segment of the stock market (such as the S&P 500 Index or Wilshire 5000). The principal aim of this strategy is to maximize diversification, minimize taxes from realizing gains, and ride the general trend of the stock market to rise.

Responsible investment emphasizes and requires a long-term horizon on the basis of fundamental analysis only, avoiding hazards in the expected return of the investment. Socially responsible investing is another investment preference.

== Annual stock market growth ==
The average annual growth rate of the United States stock market, as measured by the S&P 500 index, has historically been around 10%. This figure represents the long-term average return and is often cited as a benchmark for assessing the performance of the stock market as a whole.

The market's results from one year to the next may vary substantially from the long-term average. For instance, in 2012–2021, the S&P 500 index had an average annual return of 14.8%. However, individual annual returns can fluctuate widely, with some years experiencing negative growth and others seeing substantial gains.

While the average stock market return is around 10% per year, there is also the impact of inflation, resulting in investors' losing purchasing power of 2% to 3% every year due to it, which reduces the real rate of return on investments.

== Taxation ==
Taxation is a consideration of all investment strategies; profit from owning stocks, including dividends received, is subject to different tax rates depending on the type of security and the holding period. Most profit from stock investing is taxed via a capital gains tax. In many countries, the corporations pay taxes to the government and the shareholders once again pay taxes when they profit from owning the stock, known as "double taxation".

== Stock market scams ==
The Indian stock exchanges, Bombay Stock Exchange and National Stock Exchange of India, have been rocked by several high-profile corruption scandals. At times, the Securities and Exchange Board of India (SEBI) has barred various individuals and entities from trading on the exchanges for stock manipulation, especially in illiquid small-cap and penny stocks.

== See also ==
- Asset allocation
- Diversification (finance)
- Equity crowdfunding
- List of stock exchange trading hours
- List of stock market crashes and bear markets
- List of stock exchanges
- List of stock market indices
- Modeling and analysis of financial markets
- Financial risk management
- Securities market participants (United States)
- Securities regulation in the United States
- Stock market crash
- Stock market crashes in India
- Stock market bubble
- Stock market cycles
- Stock market data systems
- Standard deviation
- Risk management
