= Electronic trading =

Trading financial products online

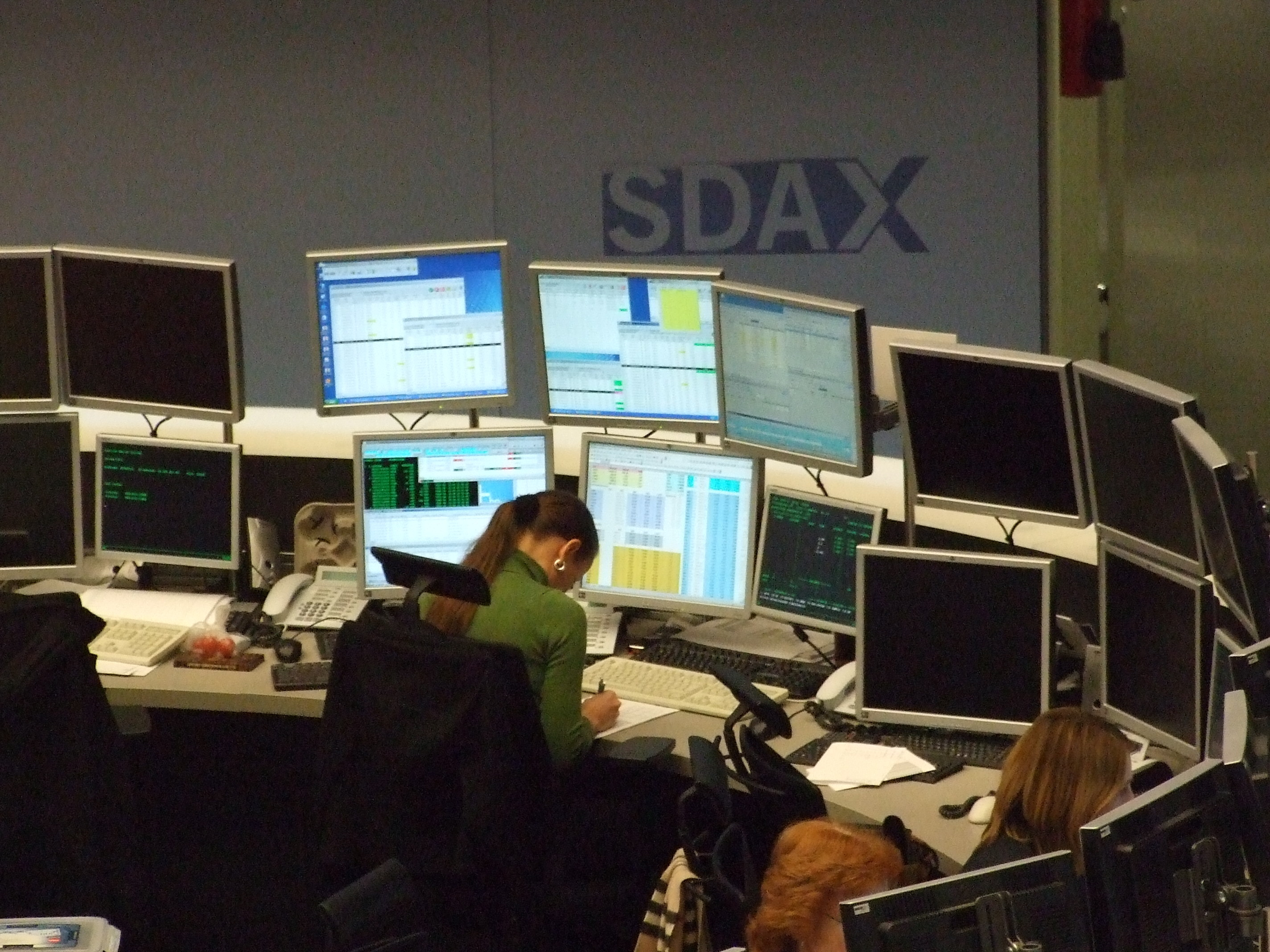
Electronic trading at the Deutsche Börse.

Electronic trading, sometimes called e-trading, is the buying and selling of stocks, bonds, foreign currencies, financial derivatives, cryptocurrencies, and other financial instruments online. This is typically done using electronic trading platforms where traders can place orders and have them executed at a trading venue such as a stock market, either directly or via a broker.

Electronic trading first started in the 1970s, and developed significantly during the 1990s and 2000s with the spread of the Internet. Electronic trading slowly replaced traditional floor trading and telephone trading over the following 20 years.

Electronic trading can include various exchange-based systems that run the matching engine for orders, such as NASDAQ, NYSE Arca and Globex, as well as other types of trading platforms, such as electronic communication networks (ECNs), alternative trading systems, crossing networks and dark pools. Electronic trading has also made possible algorithmic trading, where computers are used to place orders into the market at high speeds, such as in high-frequency trading.

== History ==
=== Before electronic trading, 1600–1970s ===
From the start of modern stock exchanges in the 1600s in Amsterdam and London, there were physical locations where buyers and sellers met and negotiated prices to buy and sell securities. By the 1800s exchange trading would typically happen on dedicated floors of an exchange. Often where traders in brightly colored jackets (to identify which firm they worked for) would shout and gesticulate at one another, a process known as open outcry or pit trading (the exchange floors were often pit-shaped – circular, sloping downwards to the center, so that the traders could see one another).

=== Development of electronic communications, 1970s ===
With the improvement in communications technology in the late 20th century, the need for a physical location became less important and together with the development in computer technology traders started to transact from remote locations in what became known as electronic trading. Electronic trading made transactions easier to complete, monitor, clear, and settle and this helped spur on its development.

Set up in 1971, NASDAQ was the world's first electronic stock market, though it originally operated as an electronic bulletin board, rather than offering straight-through processing (STP).

One of the earliest examples of widespread electronic trading was on Globex, the CME Group’s electronic trading platform conceived in 1987 and launched fully in 1992. This allowed access to a variety of financial markets such as treasuries, foreign exchange and commodities. The Chicago Board of Trade (CBOT) produced a rival system that was based on Oak Trading Systems’ Oak platform branded ‘E Open Outcry,’ an electronic trading platform that allowed for trading to take place alongside that took place in the CBOT pits. In 1994, digiTRADE was the first company to bring securities trading to the internet, with K. Aufhauser & Company, Inc as the first client, going live with "WealthWeb" in September of 1994. By June 11, 1997, digiTRADE launched interest and touch tone telephone workstations for full service brokerage firms. By January 26th, 1998, LPL Financial Services had launched a broker workstation across 2,700 registered representatives. This was a complete front-back office system for stocks, options, mutual funds and annuities, digiTRADE PRO integrates a customized LPL front-end with digiTRADE's trading applications, and will allow LPL's reps to place orders 24 hours a day via the internet. On August 31st, 1998, Thomson Financial Services acquired digiTRADE, the widely recognized leader of automated internet and telephone-based trading and account management services. By 1998, digiTRADE had deployed internet and telephone-based trading systems for 51 financial solutions including Bank of America, Bear Stearns, Chase Manhattan, Chubb, CitiBank, Dreyfus, First Union, LPL Financial, New York Life, T.Rowe Price and Wexford Clearing Services.

=== Internet from 2000s ===
With the spread of the internet in the early 2000s, a number of brokers started building electronic trading platforms to allow individual retail traders access to trade online.

By 2010s investment firms on both the buy side and sell side were increasing their spending on technology for electronic trading. With the result that many floor traders and brokers were removed from the trading process. Traders also increasingly started to rely on algorithms to analyze market conditions and then execute their orders automatically.

The move to electronic trading compared to floor trading continued to increase with many of the major exchanges around the world moving from floor trading to completely electronic trading.

Trading in the financial markets could broadly be split into two groups:

- Business-to-business (B2B) trading, often conducted on exchanges, where large investment banks and brokers trade directly with one another, transacting large amounts of securities, and
- Business-to-consumer (B2C) trading, where retail (e.g. individuals buying and selling relatively small amounts of stocks and shares) and institutional clients (e.g. hedge funds, fund managers or insurance companies, trading far larger amounts of securities) buy and sell from brokers or broker-dealers, who act as middle-men between the clients and the B2B markets.

=== Consolidation, 2010s ===
By 2010 the majority of retail trading in the United States happened over the Internet, retail trading volumes are dwarfed by institutional, inter-dealer and exchange trading. However, in developing economies, especially in Asia, retail trading constitutes a significant portion of overall trading volume. This also had some negative impacts such as the 2010 flash crash where errors in electronic trading caused a significant market crash.

For instruments which are not exchange-traded (e.g. US treasury bonds), the inter-dealer market substitutes for the exchange. This is where dealers trade directly with one another or through inter-dealer brokers. They acted as middle-men between dealers such as investment banks. This type of trading traditionally took place over the phone but brokers moved to offering electronic trading services instead.

Similarly, B2C trading traditionally happened over the phone but brokers moved to allow their clients to place orders using electronic systems. Many retail or discount brokers went online during the late 1990s and most retail stock-broking takes place online.

Larger institutional clients, however, will generally place electronic orders via proprietary electronic trading platforms such as Bloomberg Terminal or Eikon or using their brokers' proprietary software.

== Impact ==
The increase of electronic trading had some important implications:

- Reduced cost of transactions – By automating as much of the process as possible (often referred to as "straight-through processing" or STP), costs were brought down.
- Greater liquidity – electronic systems make it easier to allow different companies to trade with one another, no matter where they are located. This leads to more buyers and sellers and so greater market liquidity which increases the efficiency of the markets.
- Greater competition – While electronic trading has not necessarily lowered the cost of entry to the financial services industry, it has removed barriers within the industry and had a globalisation-style competition effect.
- Increased transparency – Electronic trading has meant that the markets are less opaque.
- Tighter spreads – The bid–offer spread represents the profit being made by the market makers. The increased liquidity, competition and transparency means that spreads have tightened.
- Having a digital footprint allows for managers to carry out transaction cost analysis and document best execution. in the EU this is a regulatory requirement under RTS 27 of MiFID II.
- 'Arms race' in pursuit of 'speed' – Several academics have argued that the continuous nature of electronic markets has incentivized a 'wasteful' technology race leading to high-frequency trading.

For retail investors, financial services on the web offer great benefits. The primary benefit is the reduced cost of transactions as well as the ease and the convenience. Online financial transactions bypass traditional hurdles such as logistics. Conversely there is concern about the impact of speculation through trading, considered negatively and of potential significant damage to the real economy.

== See also ==
- eCommerce
- Electronic communication network
- List of electronic trading platforms
- Stock market data systems
- Trading room
- 2010 Flash Crash
