= Floor trader =

Stock or commodities trader

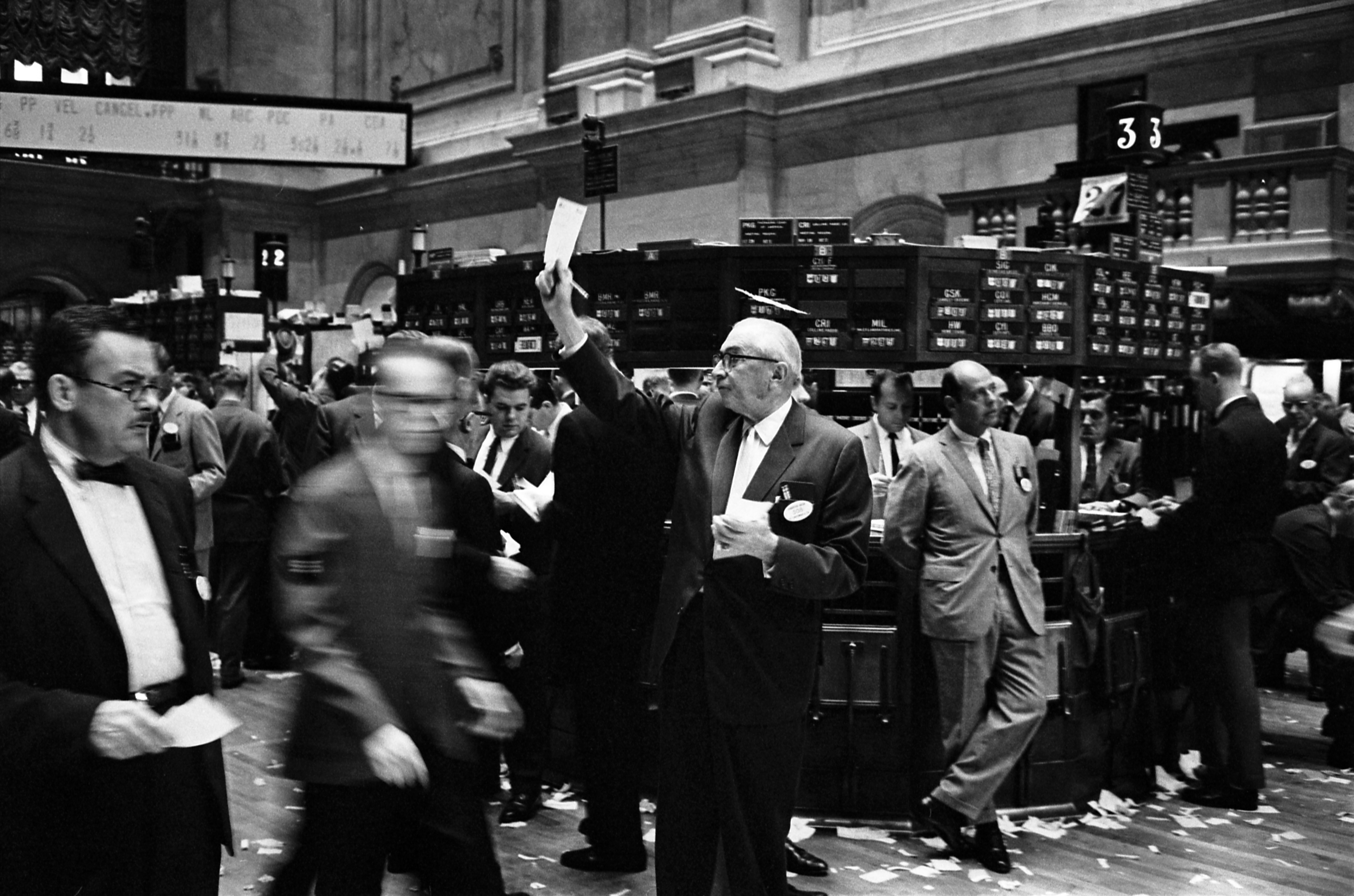
The New York stock exchange trading floor in September 1963, showing floor traders and floor brokers

A floor trader is a member of a stock or commodities exchange who trades on the floor of that exchange for their own account. The floor trader must abide by trading rules similar to those of the exchange specialists who trade on behalf of others. The term should not be confused with floor broker.

These traders are subject to a screening process before they can trade on the exchange. The people who operate as floor traders are in an open outcry system that has slowly been replaced by automated trading systems and computers that work in the same fashion as humans, without the interaction of people buying and selling stocks.

== Process of becoming a floor trader ==
Floor traders typically require experience with exchange trading practices and market procedures. Some prospective floor traders gain experience through brokerage firms or by working in exchange-related roles, such as clerk or trade-checker positions. Depending on the exchange, floor traders may also need trading privileges or membership, which can sometimes be leased rather than purchased.

Every floor trader (FT) is required to file a completed online Form 8-R and have a fingerprint card. They must also have proof from a contract market that they have been granted the trading privileges to work on the trading floor.

== Rise of machines ==
The first major electronic alternative was the Instinet, a machine that could bypass the trading floor and handle orders on a personal basis. The use of electronic mediums to conduct tasks done by floor traders has increased throughout the years; however, there are many exchanges in the United States, such as the NYSE, that prefer to use the open outcry method that involves verbal communication.

== See also ==
- Stockbroker
- Broker/dealer
- Floor broker
- Proprietary trading
- Market maker
