= TrustLeaf =

Defunct crowdfunding service

TrustLeaf, Inc.
- Company type: Private
- Industry: Friends & Family Loans, Software
- Founded: 2013
- Defunct: November 2016
- Headquarters: Sunnyvale, California
- Key people: Anson Liang (Founder, CEO); Daniel Lieser (Co-founder)
- Website: trustleaf.com

TrustLeaf was an alternative crowd funding service for startups and small businesses to raise money from friends and family using personal loans. It was founded in 2013 and was based in Sunnyvale, California. Anson Liang and Daniel Lieser were its cofounders.

== Friends and family crowdfunding ==
Unlike the more common equity or donation/rewards based crowdfunding systems, TrustLeaf arranged and kept track of personal loans. Because of legal regulations, such as SEC rules and broker-dealer licensing, the website only allowed users to request loans from people with whom they have existing personal relationships, that is, friends and family. User campaigns on TrustLeaf were private, and only visible to potential lenders who receive an invitation. Once the loans were arranged, Trustleaf sent out reminders when loan payments were due.

== Founding ==
Anson Liang designed TrustLeaf after a stressful personal experience in figuring out the details of a personal loan from a friend to start a business. He came up with the idea for a platform that helps set and manage expectations and payments for loans from friends and family. Anson explained the workings of TrustLeaf while being interviewed on the German television show Weltspiegel (World Mirror) in July 2014 on the topic of Asian-American Entrepreneurs in Silicon Valley.

== Funding campaigns ==
On TrustLeaf, users could create a campaign page and invite their friends and family to pledge funding and sign personal loan documents. If they wished, users could calculate and track repayments. A monthly usage fee and individual transactions fees were charged to each user.
