= Hybrid market =

Type of stock market exchange

A hybrid market was a stock exchange that allowed a stockbroker to choose to have an order executed through either an electronic trading system or a traditional trading floor, where it is completed manually via the more traditional live auction method, in the presence of a specialist broker.

The fully electronic method has the advantage of speed, often completing orders in less than one second, comparable manual transactions took longer but included the judgment of specialists.

This was a transitional stage between wholly physical stock markets and completely electronic stock markets. The live auction method differentiates itself with the human interaction and expert judgment of the specialists, which as of 2010 were mostly obsolete. By 2008, the New York Stock Exchange (NYSE) was working to redefine the role played by the specialists in the market. The NYSE is seen as the world's premier example of a hybrid market.

== See also ==
- Electronic trading
- Open outcry
- Trading jacket
