= Cotation Assistée en Continu =

Defunct French electronic trading system

Cotation Assistée en Continu (CAC) was an electronic trading system used at the Paris Bourse, the French stock exchange, in the 1980s and 1990s.

== History ==
It was introduced in 1986 for trading less liquid equities, and in 1989, it was operational for all listed stocks. The acronym is also used to refer to the CAC 40, a stock index provided by the Paris Bourse. Curiously, the acronym also fits the name of the early Parisian stockbrokers' association, the "Compagnie des Agents de Change". The CAC system was a version of an earlier system developed by the Toronto Stock Exchange in the mid-1970s: CATS (Computer Assisted Trading System).

In the early 1990s, the Paris Bourse developed an upgraded technology known as Nouveau Système de Cotations|NSC (Nouveau Système de Cotation), which served as a technological platform for the Euronext initiative. The Paris Bourse became Euronext Paris in 2000.

CAC, like CATS, was an order-driven market platform that handled the process of order matching and price setting through a double auction algorithm. It allowed for a full automation of quotation in a centralized, order-driven exchange.

== See also ==
- CAC 40
- Listing (finance)
