= Globex Trading System =

Electronic trading platform

The Globex Trading System is an electronic trading platform for trading both futures contracts and options contracts that is operated by the Chicago Mercantile Exchange (CME).

It was introduced in 1992 and was the first global electronic trading platform designed to handle trading of financial derivatives using electronic trading. It was developed by the Chicago Mercantile Exchange (CME) along with other technology companies and it was designed to work with the existing open outcry system at the exchange to help improve efficiencies and extend the hours of trading. Globex, or "CME Globex", offers trading approximately 23 hours a day, five days a week.

== History ==
In 1987 work began on the design of a new electronic system with the goal of enhancing futures trading at the CME. The system had gone through many iterations and enhancements throughout the next five years until 1992 when the first electronic futures trading began on the new system. When Globex was first launched, it ran on Reuters technology.

The system was also the first international electronic trading system to allow "off-hours trading in exchange contracts" and because of this the system was known early on as a "Pre/Post Market Trading" system.

== System overview ==
CME Globex was the first derivatives platform to offer global access to all major asset classes, equity indexes, agriculture, energy, metals, weather and real estate. Partnerships with other exchanges such as the Bursa Malaysia (BMD), Dubai Mercantile Exchange (DME), Korea Exchange (KRX), and the Minneapolis Grain Exchange (MGEX) provide access to market exposure around the world.

The CME Globex system is one of the fastest global electronic trading systems for futures and options trading. "Trades on the system are executed and confirmed to the customer with millisecond precision". Average daily order volume continues to increase, while the response time for trades continues to decrease.

CME Globex provides access to the broadest array of futures and options products available on any exchange, virtually around the clock, from anywhere in the world. "In 2007, roughly 14.5 percent of the exchange's options contracts were electronically traded".
