= Rosemary McFadden =

Finance expert (born 1947/48)

Rosemary McFadden (born 1947/48) was president of the New York Mercantile Exchange (NYMEX) from 1984 to 1989, making her the first woman to become president of any stocks or futures exchange in the United States. She was responsible for introducing oil trading to the exchange. Under McFadden's leadership, the NYMEX emerged as the largest energy exchange in the world.

== Early life and education ==
Rosemary McFadden moved with her family in 1951 from her birthplace of Scotland to New Jersey. She was the first in her working-class family to earn a college degree. She went on to earn an MBA from Rutgers University and a J.D. from Seton Hall University.

== Career ==
In 1984, Rosemary McFadden was elected president of the New York Mercantile Exchange. She had previously served a year as executive vice president after being promoted from staff attorney, a position she also held for just one year. After McFadden secured the crude oil contract, trading volume rose over a four-year period from 5 million contracts to 34 million contracts, and the NYMEX membership price increased from $57,000 to $350,000 by the end of her tenure in 1989. McFadden would go on to hold numerous leadership and advisory roles, including Senior Manager at Price Waterhouse, managing director at Credit Suisse, and Jersey City's Deputy Mayor and Chief of Staff.
