= Trading jacket =

Blazer uniform historically worn by pit traders

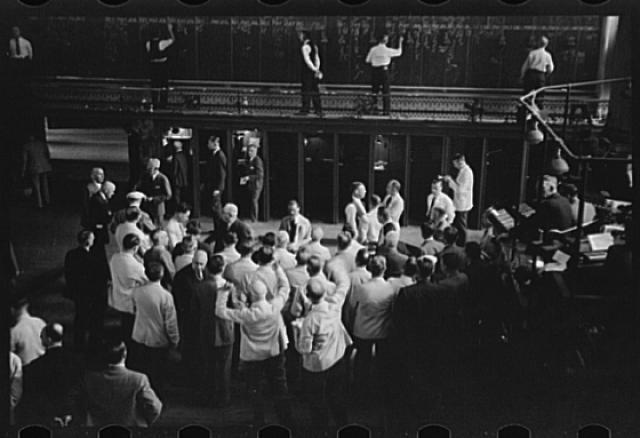
Minneapolis Grain Exchange trading floor, 1939

A trading jacket is a blazer garment worn by a broker who executes trades by open outcry in and around the trading pits of various financial exchanges. Throughout the twentieth century, trading jackets were simply white. Following counterculture of the 1960s, they became brightly colored and distinctive to assist in the identification of specific traders or the exchange members for whom they work. In the United States, American flags became a common accoutrement following the September 11 attacks. Today, trading jackets are mostly anachronistic as open outcry exchanges have been displaced by electronic trading platforms. Chicago-based PECO Inc has been the leading supplier of trading jackets since 1919.

== Nick Leeson's trading jacket ==
On 5 April 2007, the Guardian newspaper reported that KPMG, the Liquidators of Barings PLC, had sold a trading jacket thought to have been worn by Nick Leeson while trading on SIMEX in Singapore and engaging in illegal activities which led to the collapse of Barings Bank and a four-year prison term. The jacket was offered for sale on eBay but it failed to reach its reserve price despite a highest bid of £16,100. It was subsequently sold for £21,000. In October 2007 a similar jacket used by Leeson's team but not thought to have been worn by Leeson himself sold at auction for £4,000.
