= Floor broker =

Commercial exchange agent

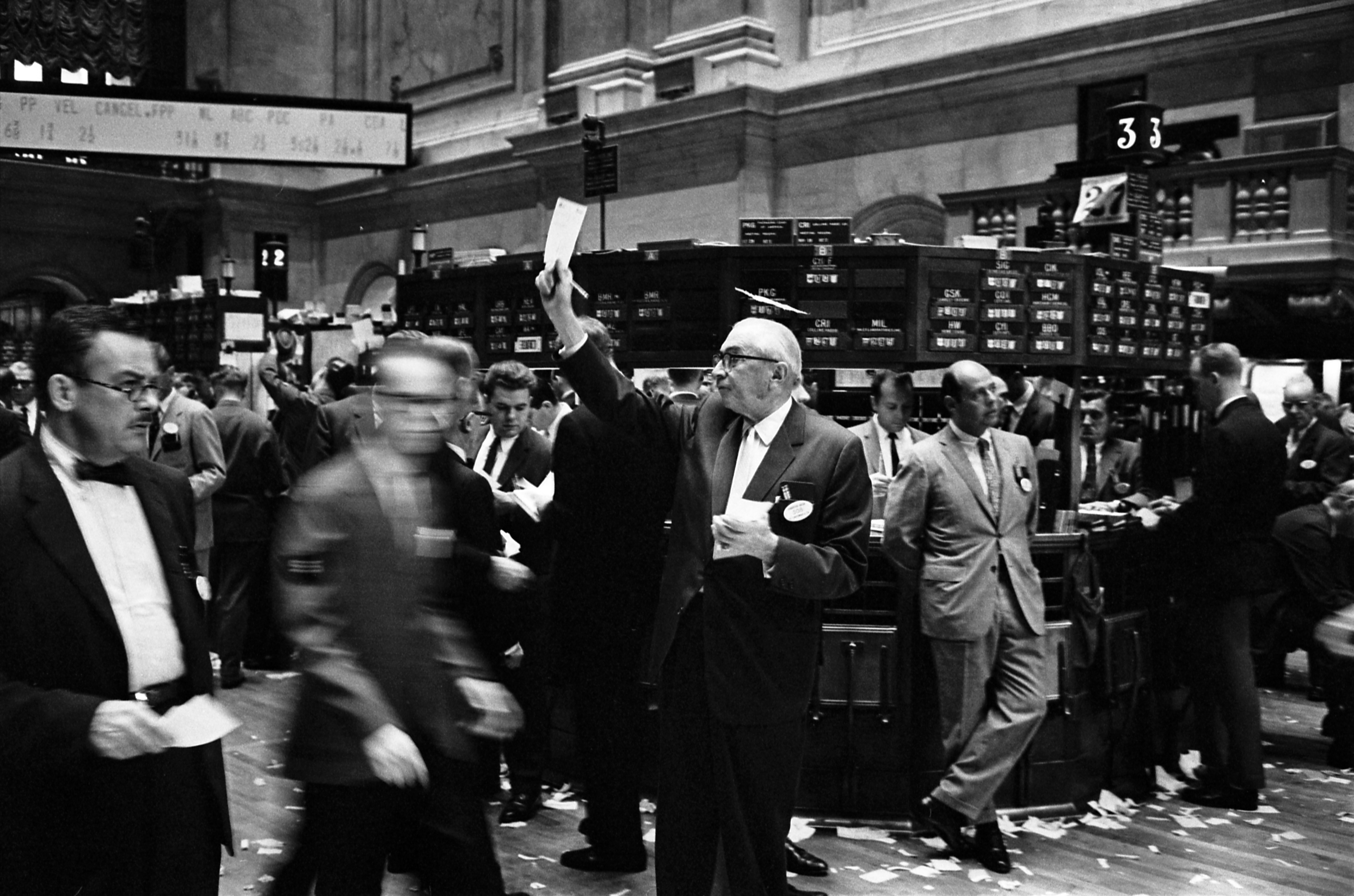
The New York Stock Exchange trading floor in September 1963, showing floor brokers

A floor broker also known as a "Pit broker" is an independent member of an exchange who can act as a broker on the trading floor. They would act on behalf of floor traders or large clients such as financial firms, as an agent on the floor of the exchange. With the advent of electronic trading in the 1990s and the closing of physical trading floors, this role has largely disappeared.

The floor broker used to receive an order via Teletype machine from their firm's trading department and then proceed to the appropriate trading post on the exchange floor. There he would join other brokers and the specialist in the security being bought or sold and executes the trade at the best competitive price available using open outcry. On completion of the transaction the customer is notified through his registered representative back at the firm and the trade is printed on the consolidated ticker tape which is displayed electronically around the country. A floor broker should not be confused with a floor trader who trades as a principal for their own account, rather than as a broker. Commission brokers were employees of a member firm.
