= CATS (trading system) =

CATS (Computer Assisted Trading System) was an automated exchange system developed by the Toronto Stock Exchange. It went live on November 18, 1977, with 90 stocks. The first trader to use the system was Ralph W. Varney of Jones Gable, who also served on the development committee. CATS was introduced, piloted and developed by Harold B. Hofmann, then the Vice President of Operations at the Toronto Stock Exchange. CATS was one of the first technologies allowing for a full automation of the price-setting process in a stock exchange. This technology was implemented in several other stock exchanges in the 1980s. In some cases, it was used as an assistance to open-outcry, but in others it allowed for a full dismantlement of the open-outcry institution. The Paris Bourse purchased this system in the early 1980s and implemented it as CAC (Cotation Assistée en Continu).

CATS handled the process of order matching and price setting through a "double auction" algorithm. It is credited for having been the first system to allow for a full automation of the price setting process in a centralized, order-driven stock market.
