= Open outcry =

Communication method on the trading floors of stock exchanges

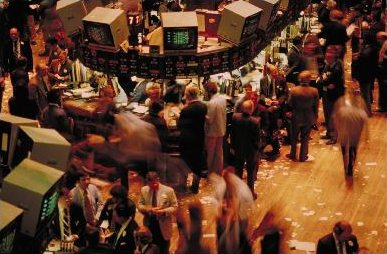
Until 2009, trades on the floor of the New York Stock Exchange always involved a face-to-face interaction. There is one podium/desk on the trading floor for each of the exchange's three thousand or so stocks.

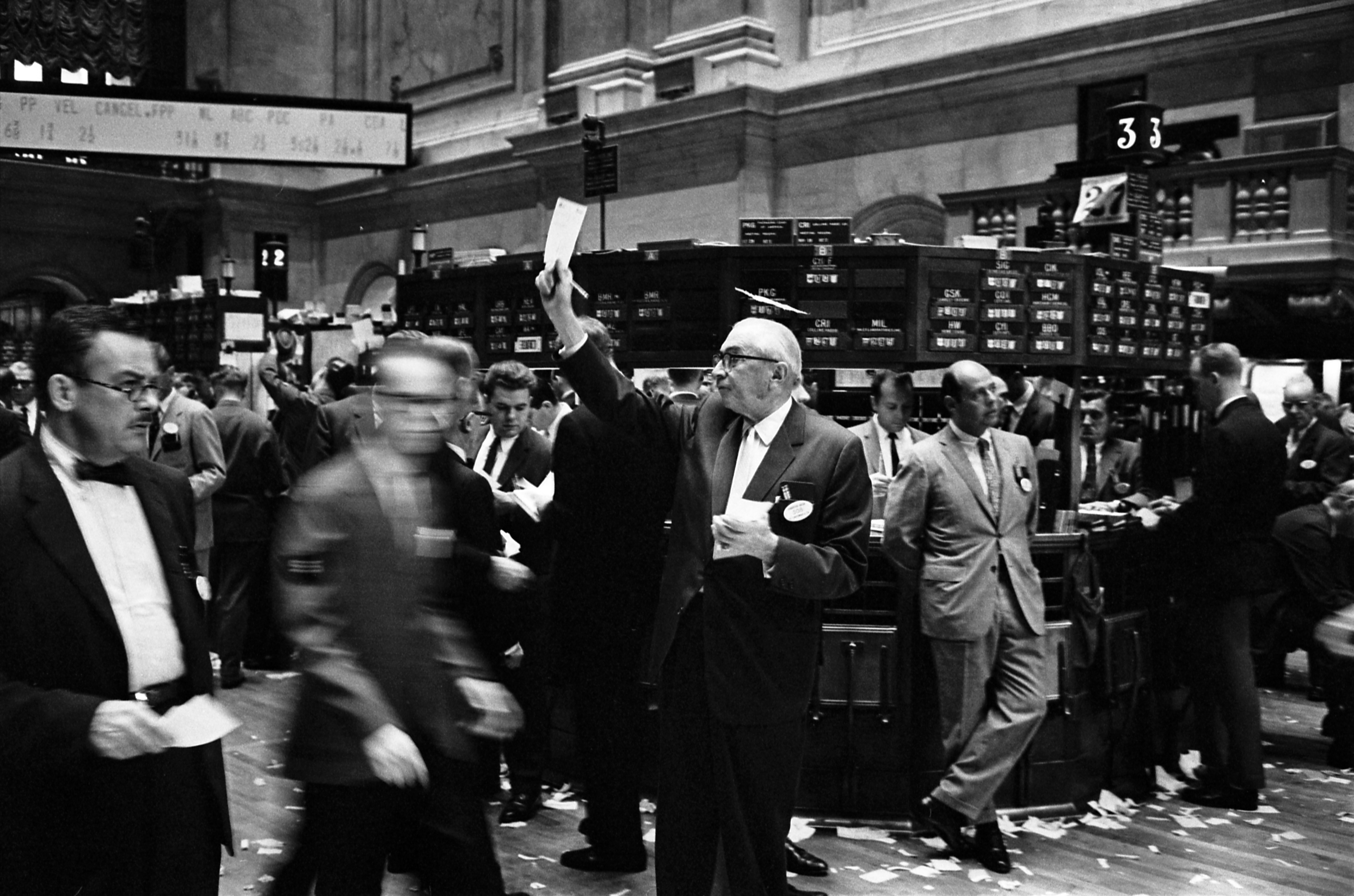
The New York stock exchange trading floor in September 1963, before the introduction of electronic readouts and computer screens

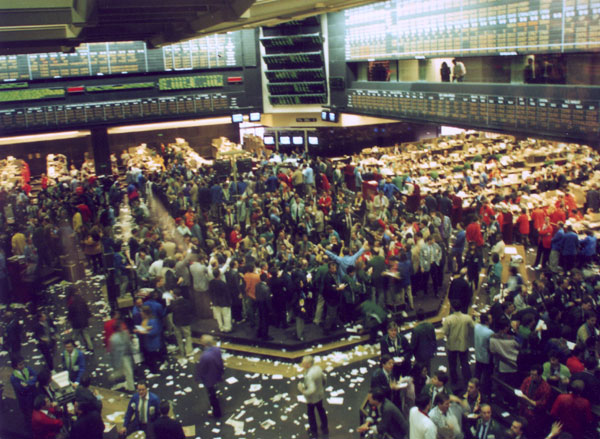
Open outcry "pit" at the Chicago Board of Trade (CBOT) in 1993

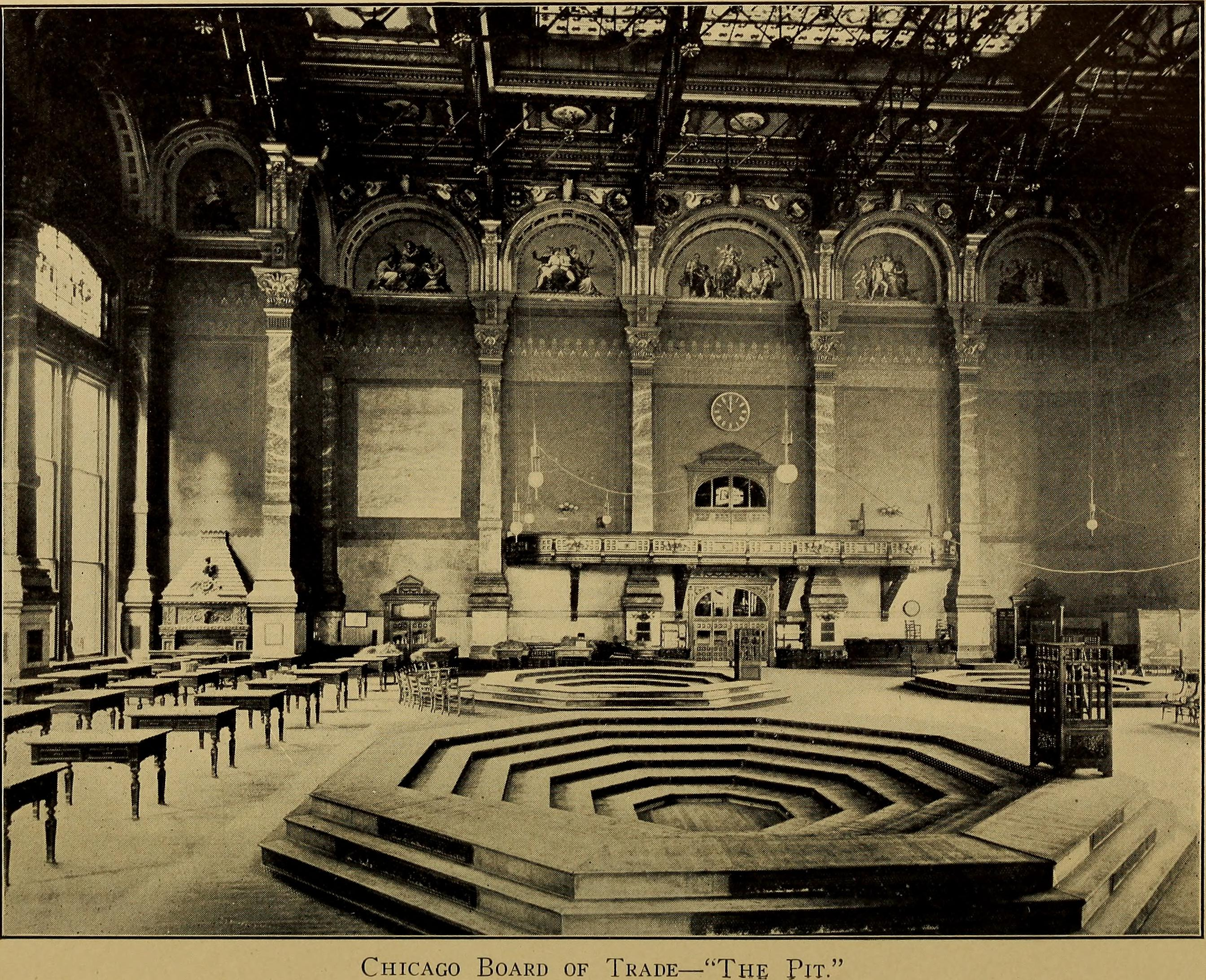
CBOT "The Pit" in 1908

Open outcry is a method of communication between professionals on a stock exchange or futures exchange, typically on a trading floor. It involves shouting and the use of hand signals to transfer information primarily about buy and sell orders. The part of the trading floor where this takes place is called a pit.

In an open outcry auction, bids and offers must be made out in the open market, giving all participants a chance to compete for the order with the best price. New bids or offers would be made if better than previous pricing for efficient price discovery. Exchanges also value positions marked to these public market prices on a daily basis. In contrast, over-the-counter markets are where bids and offers are negotiated privately between principals.

Since the development of the stock exchange in the 17th century in Amsterdam, open outcry was the main method used to communicate among traders. This started changing in the latter half of the 20th century, first through the use of telephone trading, and then starting in the 1980s with electronic trading systems.

As of 2021, a few exchanges still had floor trading using open outcry. The supporters of electronic trading claim that it is faster, cheaper, more efficient for users, and less prone to manipulation by market makers and broker/dealers. However, many traders still advocate for the open outcry system on the basis that the physical contact allows traders to speculate as to a buyer/seller's motives or intentions and adjust their positions accordingly. As of 2010, most stocks and futures contracts were no longer traded using open outcry due to the lower cost of the aforementioned technological advances. As of 2017, open outcry in the United States was very limited, such as in a much more stream-lined form at the Chicago Board of Trade owned by the CME Group.

== History ==
Since the 1980s, the open outcry systems have been steadily replaced by electronic trading systems (such as CATS and Globex).

Floor trading is the meeting of traders or stockbrokers at a specific venue referred to as a trading floor or pit to buy and sell financial instruments using open outcry method to communicate with each other. These venues are typically stock exchanges or futures exchanges and transactions are executed by members of such an exchange using specific language or hand signals. During the 1980s and 1990s, phone and electronic trading replaced physical floor trading in most exchanges around the world.

As of 2007, few exchanges still have floor trading. One example is the New York Stock Exchange (NYSE), which still executes a small percentage of its trades on the floor. That means that the traders actually form a group around the post on the floor of the market for the specialist, someone that works for one of the NYSE member firms and handles the stock. As in an auction, there are shouts from those that want to sell and those that want to buy. The specialist facilitates in the match and centralizing the trades. On 24 January 2007, the NYSE went from being strictly an auction market to a hybrid market that encompassed both the auction method and an electronic trading method that immediately makes the trade electronically. A small group of extremely high-priced stocks is not on this trading system and is still auctioned on the trading floor. Even though over 82 percent of the trades take place electronically, the action on the floor of the stock exchange still has its place. While electronic trading is faster and provides for anonymity, there is more opportunity to improve the price of a share if it goes to the floor. Investors maintain the right to select the method they want to use.

The London Metal Exchange is the last open outcry exchange in Europe. It utilises short periods of face-to-face "ring trading" for price discovery, with further trades taking place electronically.

=== Conversion to electronic trading ===
- The London Stock Exchange moved to electronic trading in 1986.
- The Borsa Italiana, Italy's stock market, located in Milan, moved to electronic trading in 1994.
- The Bombay Stock Exchange, Mumbai, embraced electronic trading in 1995 by introducing the BSE Online Trading (BOLT) System on 14 March 1995.
- The Calcutta Stock Exchange (CSE) adopted the fully online trading and reporting system C-STAR (CSE Screen Based Trading and Reporting) on April 4, 1997.
- The Johannesburg Stock Exchange (JSE) adopted electronic trading on 7 June 1996.
- The Colombo Stock Exchange (CSE) adopted electronic trading (The Automated Trading System (ATS)) in 1997.
- The Toronto Stock Exchange (TSX) adopted electronic trading in 1997.
- The Korea Exchange (KRX) adopted electronic trading in 1997.
- International Petroleum Exchange (IPE) moved to electronic trading in 2005.
- Minneapolis Grain Exchange (MGEX) moved to electronic trading in 2008.
- New York Stock Exchange, 2006–2007, under John Thain
- New York Mercantile Exchange (Nymex), 2006.
- Frankfurt Stock Exchange, 2011, all trading moved to Xetra (trading system), ending the possibility to execute orders via open outcry on the floor. Market makers, however, continue to operate on the floor as "Xetra-Specialists", providing liquidity.

Since the 1980s, Nymex had a virtual monopoly on 'open market' oil futures trading, but the electronically based IntercontinentalExchange (ICE) began trading oil contracts that were extremely similar to Nymex's in the early 2000s and Nymex began to lose market share almost immediately. The pit-traders at Nymex had been resisting the electronic move for decades, but the executives believed the exchange had to move to the electronic format, or it would cease to exist as a viable business. The executives introduced CME's Globex system into Nymex in 2006. In 2016, NYMEX ceased all open outcry trading, leaving only open outcry at its sister exchange the Chicago Board of Trade.

== Hand signals ==
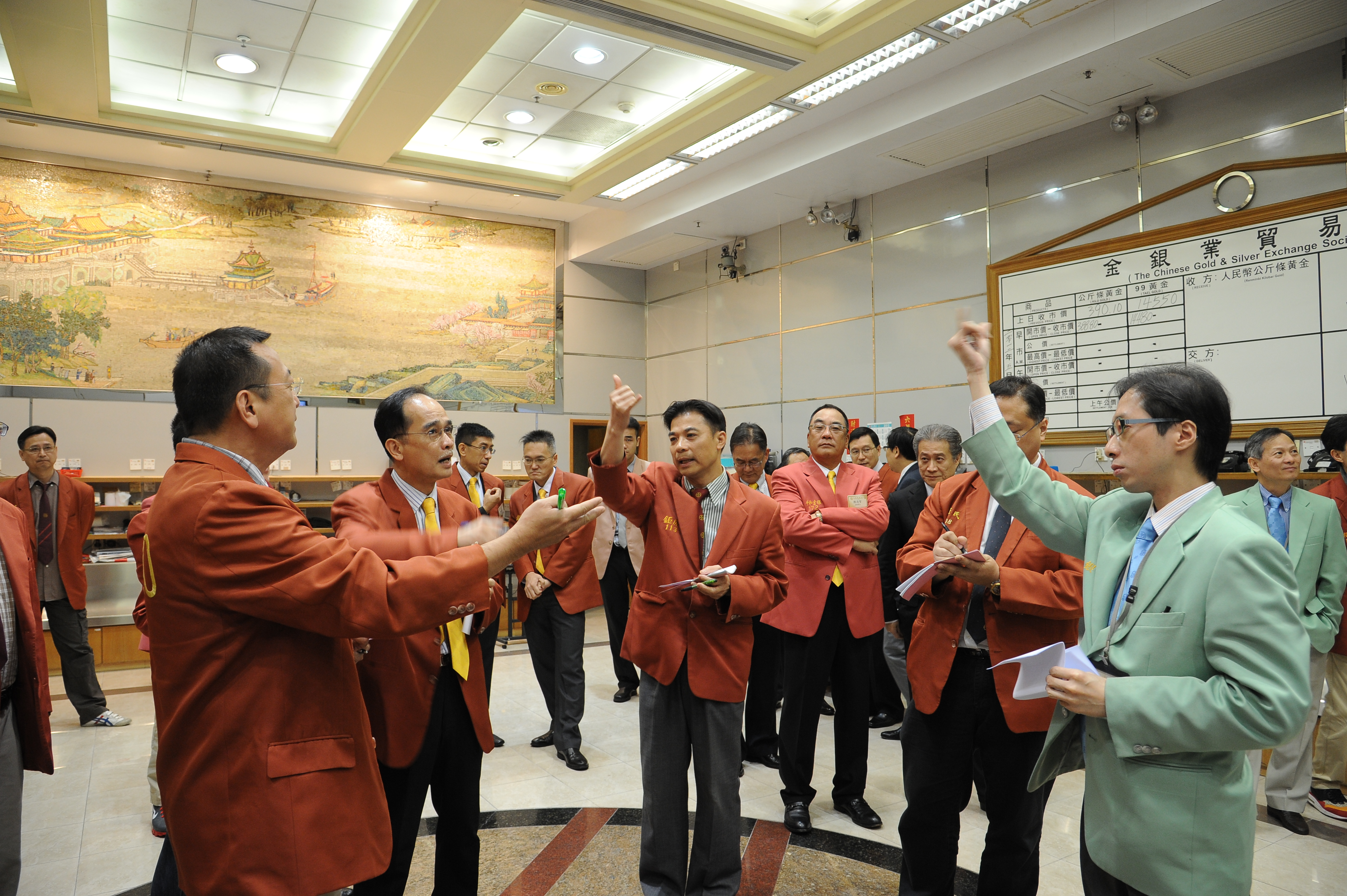
Hand signalling on the floor of the Chinese Gold and Silver Exchange Society (2012)

Floor hand signals are used to communicate buy and sell information in an open outcry trading environment. The system is used at futures exchanges such as the Chicago Mercantile Exchange.

Traders usually flash the signals quickly across a room to make a sale or a purchase. Signals that occur with palms facing out and hands away from the body are an indication the gesturer wishes to sell. When traders face their palms in and hold their hands up, they are gesturing to buy.

Numbers one through five are gestured on one hand, and six through ten are gestured in the same way only held sideways at a 90-degree angle (index finger out sideways is six, two fingers is seven, and so on). Numbers gestured from the forehead are blocks of ten, and blocks of hundreds and thousands can also be displayed. The signals can otherwise be used to indicate months, specific trade or option combinations, or additional market information.

These rules may vary among exchanges or even among floors within the same exchange; however, the purpose of the gestures remains the same.

== See also ==
- Trading jacket
