= Broker-dealer =

One who engages in the business of trading securities on behalf of their customers

In financial services, a broker-dealer is a natural person, company or other organization that engages in the business of trading securities for its own account or on behalf of its customers. Broker-dealers are at the heart of the securities and derivatives trading process.

Although many broker-dealers are "independent" firms solely involved in broker-dealer services, many others are business units or subsidiaries of commercial banks, investment banks or investment companies.

When executing trade orders on behalf of a customer, the institution is said to be acting as a broker. When executing trades for its own account, the institution is said to be acting as a dealer. Securities bought from clients or other firms in the capacity of dealer may be sold to clients or other firms acting again in the capacity of dealer, or they may become a part of the firm's holdings.

In addition to execution of securities transactions, broker-dealers are also the main sellers and distributors of mutual fund shares.

== Main points of activity ==
After announcing the price, the dealer must announce other essential conditions of the buy-sell contract of securities: minimum and maximum number of securities subject to purchase and/or sale, as well as the term of announced price's validity. Dealers perform all the functions of a stockbroker including financial consulting. They organize and support turnover (liquidity) or market-making (price announcing, duty of sell and buy of security at announced price, announcing of min and max number of securities that can be bought/sold at announced price, implementing time periods when announced prices are available. Dealers are large financial institutions that sell securities to end users and then hedge their risk by partaking in the interdealer market. Interdealers facilitate price discovery and execution between dealers.

== Regulation ==
=== United States ===
In the United States, broker-dealers are regulated under the Securities Exchange Act of 1934 by the Securities and Exchange Commission (SEC), a unit of the U.S. government. All brokers and dealers that are registered with the SEC (pursuant to 15 U.S.C. § 78o), with a number of exceptions, are required to be members of the Securities Investor Protection Corporation (SIPC) (pursuant to 15 U.S.C. § 78ccc) and are subject to its regulations. Some regulatory authority is further delegated to the Financial Industry Regulatory Authority (FINRA), a self-regulatory organization. Many states also regulate broker-dealers under separate state securities laws (called "blue sky laws").

The 1934 Act defines "broker" as "any person engaged in the business of effecting transactions in securities for the account of others", and defines "dealer" as "any person engaged in the business of buying and selling securities for his own account, through a broker or otherwise". Under either definition, the person must be performing these functions as a business; if conducting similar transactions on a private basis, they are considered a trader and subject to different requirements. When acting on behalf of customers, broker-dealers have a duty to obtain "best execution" of transactions, which generally means achieving the best economic price under the circumstances.

On April 28, 2004, the SEC voted unanimously to change the net capital rule which applies to broker-dealers, thus allowing those with "tentative net capital" of more than $5 billion to increase their leverage ratios. The rule change remains in effect, though subject to modifications.

Although broker-dealers often provide investment advice to their clients, in many situations they are exempt from registration under the U.S. Investment Advisers Act of 1940, so long as (i) the investment advice is "solely incidental" to brokerage activities; and (ii) the broker-dealer receives no "special compensation" for providing the investment advice. Both elements of this exemption must be met to rely on it.

Many broker-dealers also serve primarily as distributors for mutual fund shares. These broker-dealers may be compensated in numerous ways and, like all broker-dealers, are subject to compliance with requirements of the Securities and Exchange Commission and one or more self-regulatory organizations, such as the Financial Industry Regulatory Authority (FINRA). The forms of compensation may be sales loads from investors, or Rule 12b-1 fees or servicing fees paid by the mutual funds. There are several online portals that offer broker dealer assistance and search capabilities.

=== United Kingdom ===
UK securities law uses the term intermediary to refer to businesses involved in the purchase and sale of securities for the account of others.

The Financial Conduct Authority authorises and regulates companies engaging in such activity as "regulated activities" under the Financial Services and Markets Act 2000.

=== Japan ===
The common Japanese term for a broker-dealer is "securities company" (証券会社, shōken-gaisha). Securities companies are regulated by the Financial Services Agency under the Financial Instruments and Exchange Law. The "big five" are Nomura Securities, Daiwa Securities, SMBC Nikko Securities, Mizuho Securities, and Mitsubishi UFJ Securities. Most major commercial banks in Japan also maintain broker-dealer subsidiaries, as do many foreign commercial banks and investment banks.

Securities companies must be organized as kabushiki kaisha with a statutory auditor or auditing committee, and must maintain minimum shareholder equity of ¥50 million.

=== Largest dealer banks ===
- Bank of America Merrill Lynch
- Barclays
- BNP Paribas
- Citigroup
- Credit Suisse
- Deutsche Bank
- Goldman Sachs
- HSBC
- JPMorgan Chase
- Morgan Stanley
- Nomura
- Commerzbank AG
- Societe Generale
- The Royal Bank of Scotland
- UBS
- Wells Fargo
- Bank of New York Mellon

== See also ==
- Broker
- Securities market participants (United States)
- Trader (finance)
- Stockbroker
- Commodity broker
- Mutual fund
- Floor broker
