= World Federation of Exchanges =

Trade association based in London, England

- Founded: 1961; 65 years ago
- Headquarters: London, United Kingdom
- Key people: Nandini Sukumar (Chief Executive Officer)
- Website: www.world-exchanges.org

The World Federation of Exchanges (WFE), formerly the Federation Internationale des Bourses de Valeurs (FIBV), or International Federation of Stock Exchanges, is the trade association of publicly regulated stock, futures, and options exchanges, as well as central counterparties (CCPs). It represents over 250 market infrastructure providers, including standalone CCPs that are not part of exchange groups. Its market operators are responsible for operating the key components of the financial world. It was founded in 1961 and is based in London, United Kingdom.

== Members ==
To be a member, exchanges must adhere to the WFE Membership Criteria. Candidates are selected following a peer review.

As of October 2023, the WFE had 69 members:

- Abu Dhabi Securities Exchange
- Amman Stock Exchange
- Astana International Exchange
- Athens Stock Exchange
- Australian Securities Exchange
- B3 Brasil Bolsa Balcão
- Bahrain Bourse
- Bermuda Stock Exchange
- Bolsa de Comercio de Santiago
- Chittagong Stock Exchange
- Bolsa de Valores de Colombia
- Dhaka Stock Exchange
- Bolsa de Valores de Lima
- Bolsa Mexicana de Valores
- Borsa Istanbul
- Botswana Stock Exchange
- Boursa Kuwait
- Bourse Régionale des Valeurs Mobilières SA
- Bourse de Casablanca
- Bursa Malaysia
- CBOE Global Markets
- China Financial Futures Exchange
- China Securities Depository and Clearing Corporation
- Chittagong Stock Exchange
- CME Group
- Colombo Stock Exchange
- Cyprus Stock Exchange
- Dalian Commodity Exchange
- Dar es Salaam Stock Exchange PLC
- Deutsche Börse
- Dhaka Stock Exchange Ltd.
- Dubai Financial Market
- The Depository Trust and Clearing Corporation
- The Egyptian Exchange
- FMDQ Group
- Ghana Stock Exchange
- Hong Kong Exchanges and Clearing
- Indonesia Stock Exchange
- Intercontinental Exchange
- Japan Exchange Group
- Johannesburg Stock Exchange
- Kazakhstan Stock Exchange
- Korea Exchange
- Latinex
- Luxembourg Stock Exchange
- Malta Stock Exchange
- Muscat Securities Market
- Namibia Stock Exchange
- NASDAQ OMX
- Nairobi Securities Exchange
- National Stock Exchange of India
- Nigerian Stock Exchange
- NZX Limited
- OCC - The Options Clearing Corporation
- Palestine Exchange
- Philippine Stock Exchange
- Qatar Exchange
- Saudi Stock Exchange (Tadawul)
- Shanghai Futures Exchange
- Shanghai Stock Exchange
- Shenzhen Stock Exchange
- Singapore Exchange
- SIX Swiss Exchange
- Stock Exchange of Mauritius
- Stock Exchange of Thailand
- Taipei Exchange
- Taiwan Futures Exchange
- Taiwan Stock Exchange
- Tel Aviv Stock Exchange
- TMX Group
- Bourse de Tunis
- Vietnam Stock Exchange VNX

=== Suspended member ===
- Moscow Exchange (suspended because of the Russian invasion of Ukraine)

Former Members

- BME Spanish Exchanges
- BSE India Limited
- Bolsa de Comercio de Buenos Aires
- Euronext
- Ho Chi Minh City Stock Exchange
- London Stock Exchange Group
- Multi Commodity Exchange of India Ltd.
- Oslo Børs
- Zhengzhou Commodity Exchange

== Affiliates ==
Affiliates as of October 2023 include the following:

- Baku Stock Exchange
- Beirut Stock Exchange
- Börse Stuttgart
- Cape Town Stock Exchange
- Cboe Canada
- Dutch Caribbean Securities Exchange
- MERJ Exchange
- MIAX Options
- National Equities Exchange and Quotations
- Nepal Stock Exchange
- Pakistan Stock Exchange

Former affiliates

- Barbados Stock Exchange
- Bola Electronica de Chile
- Bolsa de Valores de Panama
- Bolsa Nacional de Valores
- Botswana Stock Exchange
- Bourse Régionale des Valeurs Mobilières
- Bucharest Stock Exchange
- Cayman Islands Stock Exchange
- Dhaka Stock Exchange
- Dubai Gold & Commodities Exchange
- FMDQ OTC Securities Exchange Archived 2019-07-28 at the Wayback Machine
- Hanoi Stock Exchange
- Indian Commodity Exchange
- Indonesia Commodity and Derivatives Exchange
- The International Stock Exchange
- Iran Fara Bourse
- Iran Mercantile Exchange
- Jamaica Stock Exchange
- Namibian Stock Exchange
- National Stock Exchange of Australia
- Port Moresby Stock Exchange
- Rosario Futures Exchange
- Saint-Petersburg International Mercantile Exchange
- Tehran Stock Exchange

== See also ==
- Exchange (organized market)
- Stock exchange
- List of stock exchanges
- List of ASEAN stock exchanges by market capitalization
- Federation of Euro-Asian Stock Exchanges
- World Forum of Central Securities Depositories
- CCP Global
