= China Securities Finance =

Chinese state-owned financial services company

- Company type: State-owned enterprise
- Industry: Financial services
- Founded: 2011
- Headquarters: Beijing, China
- Area served: China
- Revenue: ▲CN¥1.314 billion (2013)
- Operating income: ▲CN¥1.014 billion (2013)
- Net income: ▲CN¥770 million (2013)
- Total assets: ▲CN¥88.342 billion (2013)
- Total equity: ▲CN¥20.305 billion (2013)
- Footnotes / references source: 2013 annual report; in Chinese accounting standards

China Securities Finance Corp., Ltd.
- Simplified Chinese: 中国证券金融股份有限公司
- Traditional Chinese: 中國證劵金融股份有限公司
Transcriptions
Standard Mandarin
- Hanyu Pinyin: Zhōngguó zhèngquàn jīnróng gǔfèn yǒuxiàn gōngsī

Alternative Chinese name
- Simplified Chinese: 中证金融
- Traditional Chinese: 中證金融
Transcriptions
Standard Mandarin
- Hanyu Pinyin: Zhōngzhèng jīnróng

China Securities Finance Corp., Ltd. (CSF) is a Chinese state-owned financial services company founded in 2011. The company funded securities firm of China (firm that provides investment banking and brokage) for their margin business as well as lending securities for short selling business.

== Capital ==
In 2015, the share capital of the company was increased to CN¥100 billion from CN¥24 billion. It also bought shares from the market as a SPV for government intervention. The company later transferred some of the securities it bought to Central Huijin Investment, the domestic arm of the sovereign wealth fund of China.

== Shareholders ==
As of 31 December 2013

- Shanghai Stock Exchange (25.13%)
- Shenzhen Stock Exchange (25.13%)
- Shanghai Futures Exchange (17.59%)
- China Securities Depository and Clearing Corporation (14.57%)
- China Financial Futures Exchange (8.04%)
- Dalian Commodity Exchange (6.03%)
- Zhengzhou Commodity Exchange (3.52%)

== See also ==
- National Equities Exchange and Quotations sister company
