= CITIC Securities =

Chinese securities brokerage

CITIC Securities Company Limited 中信证券股份有限公司

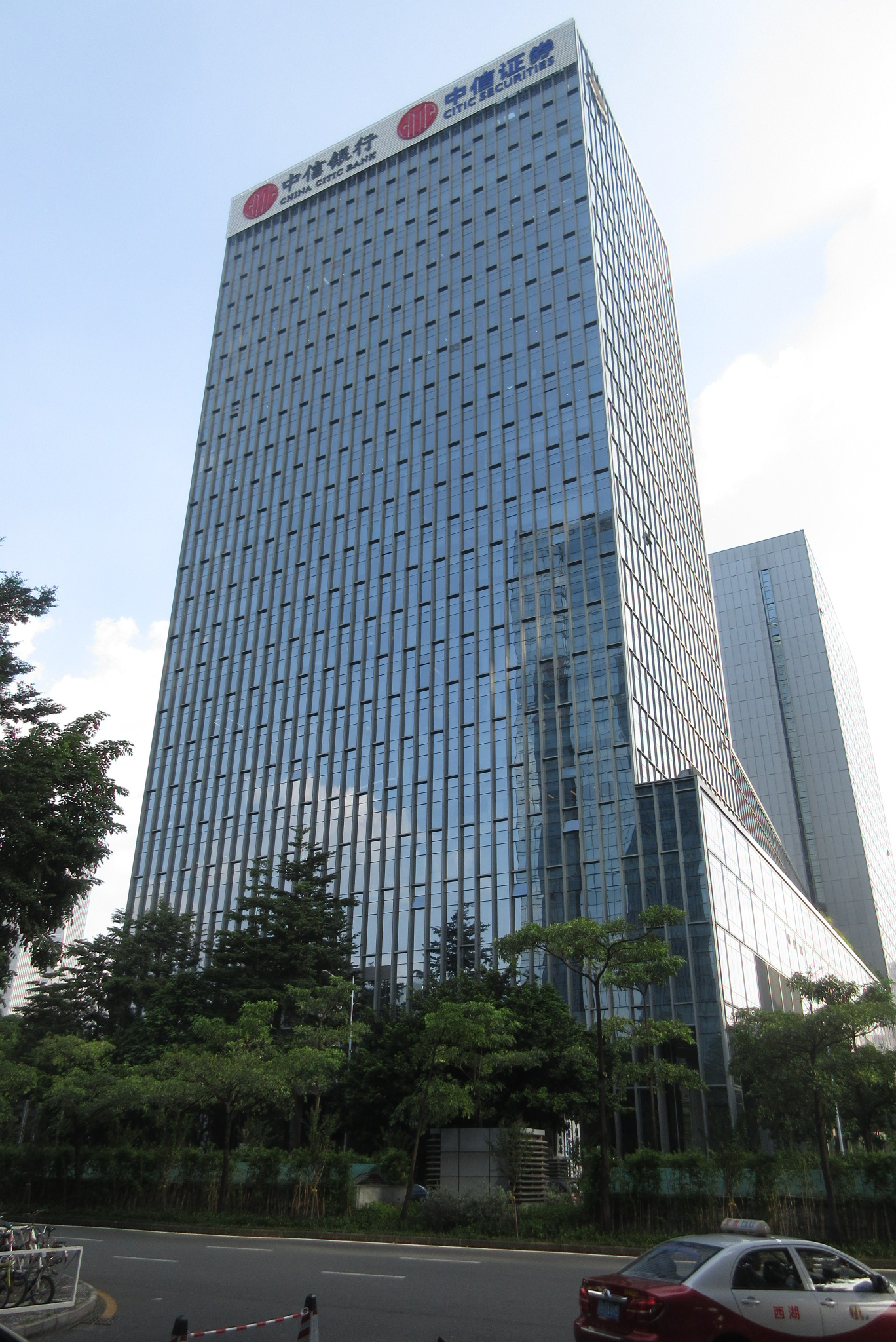
- Headquarters in Shenzhen
- Type: Public
- Traded as: SSE: 600030 (A share); SEHK: 6030 (H share); CSI A50
- Industry: Financial services
- Founded: 1995; 31 years ago
- Headquarters: CITIC Securities Tower, Shenzhen, China
- Area served: China
- Services: Investment banking; Securities brokerage
- Owner: CITIC Group (15.59%)
- Number of employees: 15,842 (2018)
- Subsidiaries: CLSA CITIC Futures
- Website: www.cs.ecitic.com

CITIC Securities Co., Ltd. is a Chinese full-service investment bank under CITIC Group, China’s top comprehensive conglomerate. It offers services in underwriting, research, brokerage, asset management, wealth management, and investment advisory. CITIC Securities was established in 1995 and it is headquartered in Shenzhen, Guangdong Province. By mid-2020, it was among China's four largest securities firms, together with Guotai Junan Securities, GF Securities, and Haitong Securities.

== Listing ==
On January 6, 2003, CITIC Securities (SSE: 600030) was listed on the Shanghai Stock Exchange (SSE). On October 6, 2011, CITIC Securities (SEHK: 6030) was listed on the Hong Kong Stock Exchange (HKEX).

== Awards ==
In 2011, CITIC Securities was awarded the "Best Equity House in China" and "Best Broker in China" by FinanceAsia; "China Equity House" by the IFR Asia; "Most Innovative Investment Bank from Asia" by The Banker. The research team have been awarded "Best Local Research Team" by New Fortune in six consecutive years.

== Overseas Subsidiary: CITIC CLSA ==
In July 2012, CITIC Securities agreed to acquire Crédit Agricole's Asia brokerage and research unit CLSA for $1.25 billion which 19.9 percent stake or $310.3 million will be bought in the first step and the remaining 80.1 percent stake or $941.7 million will be bought later.

In August 2015, CITIC Securities was reported to be in advanced talks with London Stock Exchange Group Plc to buy Russell Investments, an asset management firm based in the US. However the discussions was suspended due to a series of investigations into top CITIC Securities executives by Chinese authorities. In October London Stock Exchange announced the sale of Russell Investments to TA Associates, a Boston private equity firm for US$1.15 billion, much lower than US$1.8 billion offered by CITIC Securities.

== Futures Subsidiary: CITIC Futures ==
CITIC Futures Co., Ltd. is a wholly owned futures brokerage subsidiary of CITIC Securities. Founded in 1993, it is one of the largest futures companies in China, with over 50 branches nationwide. CITIC Futures hold memberships at all major Chinese futures exchanges, including China Financial Futures Exchange, Shanghai Futures Exchange, Dalian Commodity Exchange, Zhengzhou Commodity Exchange, Guangzhou Futures Exchange. The company offers services including futures brokerage, asset management, risk management solutions, and investment advisory services.

CITIC Futures International (CFI), the group's international arm based in Hong Kong, provides global derivatives clearing and brokerage services. CFI holds Type 2 and Type 5 licenses from the Hong Kong Securities and Futures Commission (SFC) and is a clearing participant at Hong Kong Exchanges and Clearing (HKEX) and Singapore Exchange (SGX). It provides access to over 600 derivatives products across 29 global exchanges. The company has received multiple industry awards, including "Most Active FX Futures Broker" from HKEX and "Top 5 Chinese Futures Brokers" from SGX. It maintains the highest AA rating in the China Futures Association's regulatory classification.

== Legal investigation ==
On August 25, 2015 the Chinese news media announced that several executives within CITIC Securities were under investigation for possible wrongdoing.

In September 2015, the CEO of CITIC Securities was suspected by Chinese police of leaking and trading on unspecified inside information.

In December 2015, the head of CITIC Securities investment banking division and the head of overseas investment banking business were reported to be detained by authorities to assist investigation on potential insider trading and information leakage.

On 11 March 2026, Hong Kong's Securities and Futures Commission launched a probe into the local unit of Chinese brokerage Citic Securities linked to its handling of some recent share sale transactions.

== CITIC CEFC bond default ==
In November 2016, CITIC CLSA acted as the sole bookrunner for CEFC Shanghai's $250 USD bond issuance. CITIC CLSA hid from the market that the bond deal was only 60% subscribed at pricing. It manipulated the bond price in the secondary market in an effort to offload the 100mm USD bond CITIC CLSA held on its balance sheet.

In May 2018, CITIC Group announced they would repay ca 450 million euros owed by CEFC Europe to finance and banking group J&T within days but since the debt was not paid a week later, J&T announced it had taken over shareholder rights and installed crisis management at CEFC Europe. Several days later, CEFC Shanghai defaulted on $327 million in bond payments, and offered to make the payments six months after the maturity date.

In October 2020, some retail CEFC bondholders in Hong Kong filed a complaint to the Securities and Futures Commission in Hong Kong against the bond's sole underwriter CITIC CLSA.

== See also ==
- Securities industry in China
