= Commodity trading in China =

Commodity trading in China has a short but high-growth history. With an increasing product variety and deepening liquidity pools, the mainland's futures market is playing an increasingly important role in serving the national economy.

At present, the commodity markets in China are still in a development stage, with only a few exchanges in China trading in a small group of commodities. In the next few years, the Chinese government will gradually allow more commodities products to be traded in China along with various related derivatives.

== Size ==
Trading volume of the nation's three commodity futures exchanges totaled 40.97 trillion yuan in 2007, up 95% from the year before. The aggregate trading volume of these exchanges amounted to 728.46 million hands in 2007, up 62% over the previous year. More than half of the transactions took place on the Dalian bourse, while turnover on the Shanghai bourse amounted to 23 trillion yuan, accounting for half of the total.

The boom of large trading market across the country has contributed to the increased flow of vegetables and fruit from south to north and west to east and promoted the country's commercialization of agricultural products.

== Development ==
The demand for commodity futures as hedging tools has been on the rise as the Chinese economy has grown. The country is now one of the largest producers and consumers of a wide range of commodities, including oil, steel, copper, corn, wheat and soybean. To diversify their product ranges, the nation's three commodity futures exchanges are doing research to introduce new contracts.

For example, the Shanghai bourse plans to launch new contracts on nickel, silver and steel futures in the coming years. The Zhengzhou bourse is preparing to launch early long-grain non-glutinous rice futures, while the Dalian bourse is preparing to introduce hog futures to protect hog breeders from being exposed to sharp price swings.

China is a major producer and consumer of commodities. Its commodity futures markets have expanded their range of products and provide liquidity for market participants in response to changes in the country's economy.

With increasing volatility in global commodity markets and prices, companies have been expanding their agricultural product, precious/base metal, fuel oil and other commodity-related investments in China.

== Exchanges ==
There are three commodity exchanges in China after the merger of 50 exchanges into 14 in 1995 and subsequently into three in 1999.

The China Financial Futures Exchange (CFFEX), the country's first financial futures exchange, was inaugurated in October 2006. The long-awaited CSI300, the first mainland stock index futures, will be traded on this bourse, which is working to the launch.

== See also ==
- Commodity trading in India
- Commodities exchange
- Commodity market
- State Reserves Bureau copper scandal
