= China Futures =

China Futures may refer to:

- China futures market
- China Financial Futures Exchange
- China Stock Index Futures
- China Futures Company Limited
