= List of futures exchanges =

This is a list of notable futures exchanges. Those stock exchanges that also offer trading in futures contracts besides trading in securities are listed both here and the list of stock exchanges.

== Major derivatives exchanges ==
Below is a ranking of major exchange groups that offer exchange-traded derivatives (ETD), according to "Trends in ETD Trading Annual Review – 2023" published by the Futures Industry Association (FIA) on 31 January 2024.

Ranking of major exchange groups, ranked by trading volume in 2023
| Rank | Exchange groups and exchanges | Trading volume | | Open interest | |
| Rank | Exchange groups and exchanges | Jan. - Dec. 2023 | YoY % Change | Dec. 2023 | YoY % Change |
|---|---|---|---|---|---|
| 1 | NSE Group | 84,817,136,379 | 122.5% | 36,247,772 | 55.1% |
| 1 | National Stock Exchange of India (NSE) | 84,807,400,658 | 122.5% | 36,002,960 | 54.0% |
| 1 | NSE International Exchange (NSE IX) | 9,735,721 | n/a | 244,812 | n/a |
| 2 | B3 — Brasil, Bolsa, Balcão | 8,314,951,631 | 0.0% | 203,552,906 | 61.5% |
| 3 | CME Group | 6,099,488,339 | 4.3% | 105,040,548 | 8.1% |
| 3 | Chicago Mercantile Exchange (CME) | 3,209,300,188 | -1.6% | 59,573,736 | 2.0% |
| 3 | Chicago Board of Trade (CBOT) | 2,211,191,467 | 13.7% | 30,599,260 | 21.1% |
| 3 | New York Mercantile Exchange (NYMEX) | 536,342,083 | 4.3% | 12,904,391 | 9.5% |
| 3 | Commodity Exchange (COMEX) | 142,654,601 | 14.2% | 1,963,161 | 17.8% |
| 4 | BSE | 5,873,771,364 | 265.0% | 762,450 | -44.3% |
| 4 | Bombay Stock Exchange (BSE) | 5,826,602,581 | 311.2% | 761,778 | -44.3% |
| 4 | India International Exchange (India INX) | 47,168,783 | -75.5% | 672 | -34.1% |
| 5 | Cboe Global Markets (Cboe) | 3,708,455,548 | 6.7% | 343,822 | 13.2% |
| 5 | Cboe Options Exchange (C1) | 2,024,298,392 | 19.1% | n/a | n/a |
| 5 | Cboe EDGX Options Exchange (EDGX) | 630,097,327 | 9.8% | n/a | n/a |
| 5 | Cboe BZX Options Exchange (BZX) | 550,606,231 | -25.7% | n/a | n/a |
| 5 | Cboe C2 Options Exchange (C2) | 448,428,060 | 10.1% | n/a | n/a |
| 5 | Cboe Futures Exchange (CFE) | 54,978,566 | 0.4% | 343,417 | 13.1% |
| 5 | Cboe Europe Derivative Exchange (CEDX) | 46,971 | 57.8% | 405 | 426.0% |
| 5 | ErisX | 1 | -100.0% | - | n/a |
| 6 | Intercontinental Exchange (ICE) | 3,656,460,603 | 6.4% | 81,708,385 | 18.2% |
| 6 | NYSE Arca | 1,229,015,809 | 3.1% | n/a | n/a |
| 6 | ICE Futures Europe | 1,187,841,122 | 10.9% | 37,092,511 | 18.4% |
| 6 | NYSE American | 745,956,812 | 3.5% | n/a | n/a |
| 6 | ICE Futures U.S. | 407,931,374 | 3.6% | 40,940,201 | 15.3% |
| 6 | ICE Endex | 81,119,764 | 52.2% | 3,638,061 | 58.8% |
| 6 | ICE Futures Abu Dhabi | 2,330,141 | 71.3% | 35,589 | -12.3% |
| 6 | ICE Futures Singapore | 2,265,581 | -18.1% | 2,023 | -39.7% |
| 7 | Zhengzhou Commodity Exchange (ZCE) | 3,532,952,087 | 47.4% | 13,541,868 | 0.5% |
| 8 | Nasdaq, Inc. | 3,203,620,030 | 1.8% | 4,454,125 | -11.7% |
| 8 | Nasdaq PHLX | 1,144,092,199 | 2.4% | n/a | n/a |
| 8 | Nasdaq Options Market | 622,562,417 | -18.6% | n/a | n/a |
| 8 | Nasdaq ISE | 597,258,932 | 8.2% | n/a | n/a |
| 8 | Nasdaq BX Options | 331,245,641 | 21.7% | n/a | n/a |
| 8 | Nasdaq GEMX | 245,525,725 | 12.6% | n/a | n/a |
| 8 | Nasdaq MRX | 196,973,399 | 28.8% | n/a | n/a |
| 8 | Nasdaq Exchanges Nordic Markets | 65,732,123 | -7.1% | 4,360,748 | -11.9% |
| 8 | Nasdaq Commodities | 229,594 | -20.3% | 93,377 | -2.8% |
| 9 | Dalian Commodity Exchange (DCE) | 2,508,333,822 | 10.2% | 13,435,769 | 9.8% |
| 10 | Shanghai Futures Exchange (SHFE) | 2,226,957,843 | 14.6% | 9,809,038 | 12.9% |
| 10 | Shanghai Futures Exchange (SHFE) | 2,060,693,705 | 13.0% | 9,302,434 | 10.5% |
| 10 | Shanghai International Energy Exchange (INE) | 166,264,138 | 38.4% | 506,604 | 84.8% |
| 11 | Borsa Istanbul (BIST) | 2,085,602,517 | -23.5% | 15,330,084 | -22.7% |
| 12 | Korea Exchange (KRX) | 2,038,379,367 | -1.0% | 11,133,459 | 13.2% |
| 13 | Deutsche Börse | 1,915,115,895 | -2.1% | 115,347,073 | -5.0% |
| 13 | Eurex Exchange (EUREX) | 1,915,115,895 | -2.1% | 115,347,073 | -5.0% |
| 14 | Miami International Holdings (MIH) | 1,589,908,527 | 22.1% | 63,238 | 5.2% |
| 14 | MIAX Options | 647,128,959 | 47.7% | n/a | n/a |
| 14 | MIAX Pearl | 634,027,436 | 15.5% | n/a | n/a |
| 14 | MIAX Emerald | 305,857,301 | -2.1% | n/a | n/a |
| 14 | Minneapolis Grain Exchange (MGEX) | 2,894,831 | -12.1% | 63,238 | 5.2% |
| 15 | Moscow Exchange (MOEX) | 1,304,127,469 | 2.8% | 46,606,582 | 268.6% |
| 16 | TMX Group (TMX) | 865,382,847 | 13.7% | 15,600,945 | 17.4% |
| 16 | Boston Options Exchange (BOX) | 693,138,435 | 13.5% | n/a | n/a |
| 16 | Montreal Exchange (MX) | 172,244,412 | 14.5% | 15,600,945 | 17.4% |
| 17 | Hong Kong Exchanges and Clearing (HKEX) | 480,360,531 | 5.6% | 14,095,729 | 14.3% |
| 17 | Hong Kong Exchanges and Clearing (HKEX) | 331,466,384 | 3.4% | 11,844,968 | 8.3% |
| 17 | London Metal Exchange (LME) | 148,894,147 | 11.0% | 2,250,761 | 62.0% |
| 18 | Multi Commodity Exchange of India (MCX) | 443,704,088 | 103.3% | 592,046 | 41.3% |
| 19 | Japan Exchange Group (JPX) | 394,038,990 | 0.5% | 3,395,946 | 0.1% |
| 19 | Osaka Exchange (OSE) | 392,173,920 | 0.6% | 3,346,923 | 0.2% |
| 19 | Tokyo Commodity Exchange (TOCOM) | 1,865,070 | -25.2% | 49,023 | -5.3% |
| 20 | Taiwan Futures Exchange (TAIFEX) | 324,644,847 | -15.6% | 1,135,213 | 19.1% |
| 21 | MATba ROFEX | 311,211,933 | 3.8% | 1,030,627 | -62.3% |
| 21 | MATba ROFEX | 311,201,997 | 3.8% | 1,025,337 | -62.5% |
| 21 | Uruguay Futures Exchange | 9,936 | 163.6% | 5,290 | 138.1% |
| 22 | JSE Limited (JSE) | 261,189,473 | 27.5% | 16,708,041 | 5.3% |
| 23 | Singapore Exchange (SGX) | 243,139,241 | -6.5% | 4,637,735 | 2.3% |
| 24 | Australian Securities Exchange (ASX) | 223,741,637 | 10.9% | 9,224,619 | 9.2% |
| 24 | ASX 24 | 153,812,929 | 13.6% | 3,702,918 | 13.6% |
| 24 | ASX | 69,928,708 | 5.5% | 5,521,701 | 6.4% |
| 25 | China Financial Futures Exchange (CFFEX) | 168,340,048 | 10.9% | 1,852,728 | 43.2% |
| 26 | Euronext | 157,863,443 | -11.6% | 19,416,146 | 3.4% |
| 26 | Euronext Derivatives Market | 132,621,496 | -12.5% | 14,839,119 | 2.8% |
| 26 | Borsa Italiana (IDEM) | 25,241,947 | -6.8% | 4,577,027 | 5.3% |
| 27 | Thailand Futures Exchange (TFEX) | 129,491,241 | -5.0% | 2,684,517 | -32.6% |

== Africa ==
=== Kenya ===
- Nairobi Securities Exchange (NEXT)

=== Nigeria ===
- Nigerian Stock Exchange (NSE)

=== South Africa ===
- South African Futures Exchange (SAFEX)

== Asia ==
=== Eastern Asia ===
==== Mainland China ====
- China Financial Futures Exchange (CFFEX)
- Dalian Commodity Exchange (DCE)
- Shanghai Futures Exchange (SHFE)
- Zhengzhou Commodity Exchange (ZCE)
- Guangzhou Futures Exchange (GZFE)

==== Hong Kong ====
- Hong Kong Exchanges and Clearing (HKEx)
  - Hong Kong Futures Exchange (HKFE) [merged]
  - Hong Kong Stock Exchange (HKSE) [merged]
  - London Metal Exchange (LME)
- Hong Kong Mercantile Exchange (HKMEx, defunct)

==== Japan ====
- Japan Exchange Group (JPX)
  - Osaka Exchange (OSE)
  - Tokyo Commodity Exchange (TOCOM)
- Osaka Dojima Exchange (ODEX)
- Tokyo Financial Exchange (TFX)

==== South Korea ====
- Korea Exchange (KRX), formed from merger of KOSDAQ

==== Taiwan ====
- Taiwan Futures Exchange (TAIFEX)

=== South-eastern Asia ===
==== Indonesia ====
- Indonesia Commodity and Derivatives Exchange (ICDX)
- Jakarta Futures Exchange (JFX)

==== Malaysia ====
- Bursa Malaysia

==== Philippines ====
- Manila Commodity Exchange (MCX)

==== Singapore ====
- Singapore Commodity Exchange (SICOM)
- Singapore Exchange (SGX)
- Singapore Mercantile Exchange (SMX)
- Asia Pacific Exchange (APEX)

==== Thailand ====
- Thailand Futures Exchange Public Company Limited (TFEX)
- Bond Electronic Exchange (BEX)
- Agricultural Futures Exchange of Thailand (AFET) (Closed on 1 November 2016)

=== Southern Asia ===
==== Bangladesh ====
- Chittagong Stock Exchange (CSE)
- Dhaka Stock Exchange (DSE)

==== India ====
- Bombay Stock Exchange (BSE)
- Indian Energy Exchange (IEX)
- Metropolitan Stock Exchange (MSEI) (Formerly known as MCX-SX)
- Multi Commodity Exchange (MCX)
- National Commodity and Derivatives Exchange (NCDEX)
- National Spot Exchange
- National Stock Exchange of India (NSE)
- Petroleum Exchange of India (PetEx)

==== Iran ====
- Iran Mercantile Exchange
- Iranian Energy Exchange (IRENEX)
- Iranian oil bourse
- Tehran Stock Exchange

==== Nepal ====
- Commodity Futures Exchange Limited (CFX)
- Nepal Derivative Exchange Limited (NDEX)
- Commodity and Metal Exchange Limited (COMEN)
- MEX Nepal (MEX)

==== Pakistan ====
- Pakistan Stock Exchange (PSX)
- Karachi Stock Exchange (KSE) merged into PSX
- Pakistan Mercantile Exchange (PMEX), formerly National Commodity Exchange Limited (NCEL)

=== Western Asia ===
==== Turkey ====
- Turkish Derivatives Exchange (TURDEX, in Turkish: Vadeli İşlem ve Opsiyon Borsası or VOB)

==== United Arab Emirates ====
- Dubai Gold & Commodities Exchange
- Dubai Mercantile Exchange (DME)
- NASDAQ Dubai
- ICE Futures Abu Dhabi

== Europe ==
| Country/Region | Exchange | Notes |
|---|---|---|
| Pan-European | Eurex Exchange | Part of Deutsche Börse Group |
| Pan-European | Euronext | Multi-country derivatives (France, Netherlands, etc.) |
| Pan-European | European Climate Exchange | Carbon derivatives |
| Pan-European | European Energy Exchange (EEX) | Power & commodity futures (Deutsche Börse) |
| Pan-European | NASDAQ OMX Commodities Europe | Nordic markets (power, energy) |
| Austria | Energy Exchange Austria | Energy |
| Belgium | BELFOX | Belgian Futures & Options Exchange (historic) |
| Czechia | OTE | Prague CO₂ emission market |
| France | Euronext Paris | French derivatives market |
| Germany | Eurex Exchange (EUREX) | Deutsche Börse, financial derivatives |
| Germany | European Energy Exchange (EEX) | Commodity exchange, part of Deutsche Börse |
| Greece | Athens Stock Exchange (Derivatives Market) | Equity & derivatives |
| Hungary | Budapest Stock Exchange (BSE) | Derivatives |
| Norway | Imarex | Shipping/freight derivatives |
| Poland | Warsaw Stock Exchange (GPW) | Financial & commodity derivatives |
| Romania | Bursa de Valori București (BVB) | Bucharest Stock Exchange, derivatives |
| Russia | Moscow Exchange | Financial & commodities |
| Russia | Moscow Interbank Currency Exchange (MICEX) | Merged into MOEX (2012) |
| Russia | RTS Stock Exchange (RTS) | Merged into MOEX (2012) |
| Serbia | Belgrade Stock Exchange (BELEX) | Limited derivatives |
| Slovakia | Commodity Exchange Bratislava (CEB) | Commodities |
| Spain | Mercado Español de Futuros Financieros (MEFF) | Financial futures |
| Sweden (Nordic) | Nasdaq Nordic (Nasdaq Stockholm – Derivatives Market) | Financial derivatives (govt & mortgage bond futures, STIBOR/NIBOR futures, OTC rate derivatives) |
| Ukraine | Ukrainian Exchange (UX) | Derivatives |
| United Kingdom | ICE Futures Europe | Former LIFFE and IPE, owned by Intercontinental Exchange |
| United Kingdom | London Metal Exchange (LME) | Metals, owned by Hong Kong Exchanges and Clearing |
| United Kingdom | Baltic Exchange | Freight derivatives, owned by Singapore Exchange |

== North America ==
=== Canada ===
- Montreal Exchange (MX) (owned by the TMX Group)

=== Mexico ===
- Mexican Derivatives Exchange (MexDer)

=== United States ===
- Cboe Global Markets, Inc. (CBOE / CFE)
- CME Group
  - International Monetary Market (IMM)
  - Chicago Board of Trade (CBOT) (Since 2007 a Designated Contract Market owned by the CME Group)
  - Chicago Mercantile Exchange (CME / GLOBEX) (Since 2007 a Designated Contract Market owned by the CME Group)
  - New York Mercantile Exchange (NYMEX) and (COMEX) (Since 2008 Designated Contract Markets owned by the CME Group)
  - Kansas City Board of Trade (KCBT) (Since 2012, a Designated Contract Market owned by the CME Group)
  - NEX Group plc (NXG.L) (Since 2018, a Swap Execution Facility owned by the CME Group)
- Intercontinental Exchange (ICE)
  - International Petroleum Exchange (IPE) 2001
  - New York Board of Trade (NYBOT) 2005
  - Winnipeg Commodity Exchange (WCE) 2007
  - TSX Group's Natural Gas Exchange Partnership 2008
  - European Climate Exchange 2010
  - Chicago Climate Exchange (CCE) 2010
  - NYSE 2013
  - London International Financial Futures and Options Exchange (LIFFE) 2013 (from NYSE Euronext)
- Minneapolis Grain Exchange (MGEX)
- Nadex (formerly HedgeStreet)
- Nodal Exchange
- OneChicago (Single-stock futures (SSF's) and Futures on ETFs, defunct)

== Oceania ==
=== Australia ===
- Australian Securities Exchange (ASX)
- Financial and Energy Exchange (FEX Global)

=== New Zealand ===
- New Zealand Exchange

== South America ==
=== Argentina ===
- MATba ROFEX
  - Mercado a Término de Buenos Aires (MATba)
  - ROFEX (Rosario Futures Exchange)
- Mercado Abierto Electrónico

=== Brazil ===
- B3 — Brasil, Bolsa, Balcão

=== Uruguay ===
- UFEX (Uruguay Futures Exchange).

== See also ==
- List of ASEAN stock exchanges by market capitalization
- List of commodities exchanges
- List of financial supervisory authorities by country
- List of stock exchanges
- List of stock market indices
