= Mobile emission reduction credit =

A mobile emission reduction credit (MERC) is an emission reduction credit generated within the transportation sector. The term “mobile sources” refers to motor vehicles, engines, and equipment that move, or can be moved, from place to place. Mobile sources include vehicles that operate on roads and highways ("on-road" or "highway" vehicles), as well as nonroad vehicles, engines, and equipment. Examples of mobile sources are passenger cars, light trucks, large trucks, buses, motorcycles, earth-moving equipment, nonroad recreational vehicles (such as dirt bikes and snowmobiles), farm and construction equipment, cranes, lawn and garden power tools, marine engines, ships, railroad locomotives, and airplanes. In California, mobile sources account for about 60 percent of all ozone forming emissions and for over 90 percent of all carbon monoxide (CO) emissions from all sources.

== Background ==
Government agencies worldwide have struggled with finding new and innovative approaches to address the growing problem of air pollution and global warming. Experts in the field have recognized the importance of developing solutions to reduce greenhouse gas (GHG) emissions. Most proposed strategies to mitigate global climate change focus on reducing the dominant source of GHG emissions to the atmosphere – combustion of fossil fuels, which releases carbon dioxide. Carbon dioxide emissions represent about 84 percent of total U.S. GHG emissions. In the United States, most carbon dioxide (98 percent) is emitted as a result of the combustion of fossil fuels; consequently, carbon dioxide emissions and energy use are highly correlated.

== General emission reduction strategies ==
The two main approaches that have been developed to address this problem include a command-and-control regulatory system and Emissions credit trading. Three broad types of emissions credit trading programs have emerged: reduction credit, averaging, and cap-and-trade programs. In such programs, a central authority, such as an air pollution control district or a government agency, sets limits or "caps" on certain pollutants. Companies or fleets of vehicles that intend to exceed these limits may buy emission reduction credits (ERCs) from entities that are able to remain below the designated limits. This transfer is usually referred to as a trade.

=== International approach to emission reduction credits ===
Emission trading is contemplated on an international level. The Kyoto Protocol is an agreement made under the United Nations Framework Convention on Climate Change (UNFCCC). The Kyoto Protocol binds ratifying nations to a similar system, with the UNFCCC setting caps for each nation, and utilizes a clean development mechanism (CDM) system. The primary reduction strategy under the Kyoto Protocol is a trading system that essentially makes carbon credits a commodity like oil or gas.

=== United States approach to emission reduction credits ===
The United States (which did not ratify the Kyoto Protocol) has the most experience with domestic emissions trading markets. The Clean Air Act (1970) is a federal law that requires the United States Environmental Protection Agency (EPA) to develop and enforce regulations to protect the general public from exposure to airborne contaminants that are known to be hazardous to human health. The Clean Air Act (1990) or Clean Air Act amendments of 1990 authorized the use of market-based approaches such as emission trading to assist states in attaining and maintaining air quality for all criteria pollutants. EPA's subsequent interpretive rulings expressly allow owners of new sources to obtain emission credits from other companies that operate facilities located in the same air quality control region. To implement an emissions offset program, many states have developed regulations allowing sources to register their emissions reduction credits as ERCs that can be sold to companies required to offset emissions from new or modified sources. Brokerage companies typically handle sales between companies having surplus ERCs and those wanting to acquire such credits.

All commonly accepted ERCs in the United States must meet each of five criteria before they can be certified by the relevant regulatory authority as an ERC. Namely, the emission reduction must be real, permanent over the period of credit generation, quantifiable, enforceable, and surplus to emission reductions that are already needed to comply with an existing requirement (local, state, or Federal) or air quality plan. These criteria are intended to ensure that the emission reduction is a permanent reduction from the emissions that would otherwise be allowed to offset the permanent increase in emissions from the new or expanding source.

=== Steps to create a MERC ===
The steps involved to create a MERC are as follows:

1. Identifying an emissions reduction technology for a pollutant
2. Identifying a mobile source
3. Utilize a portable emissions measurement system to measure emissions of the pollutant and take first measurements of the pollutant from the mobile source
4. Analyze the measurements to develop a baseline emissions amount
5. Apply the emissions reduction technology to the mobile source to provide a modified mobile source
6. Connect the portable emissions measurement system to the modified mobile source and take second measurements of the modified mobile source
7. Analyze the second measurements to develop a modified emissions amount
8. Quantify the mobile emissions reduction produced by the emissions reduction technology
9. Convert the mobile emissions reduction into a tradable commodity

=== Monetization of a MERC ===
The process of converting the mobile emissions reduction into a tradable commodity consists of converting the reduction or a portion of the reduction of emissions into at least one tradable credit, and marketing and monetizing the credit. This is followed by receiving information to identify a customer account, assigning the mobile emissions reduction to the customer account, calculating a MERC from the mobile emissions reduction, and crediting the MERC to the customer account. What follows is the exchanging of the MERC in the customer account for monetary assets this includes the following steps:

1. Debiting the MERC from the customer account
2. Receiving information to identify a second customer or purchaser
3. Calculating an emissions amount of the pollutant for the purchaser
4. Assigning a liability value to the emissions amount for the purchaser
5. Accepting payment from the purchaser
6. Using the payment to purchase at least one MERC for the purchaser
7. Crediting the MERC as assets against the liability value assigned to the second customer for the emissions amount, whereby the emissions amount and the liability value in the second customer account is reduced accordingly

== Target pollutants of mobile emission reduction credits ==
At present, the pollutant may be selected from a group consisting of nitrogen oxides (NOx), carbon monoxides (CO), carbon dioxides (CO_{2}), hydrocarbons (HC), sulfur oxides (SOx), particulate matter (PM) and volatile organic compounds (VOCs). The emissions reduction technology may be selected from a group consisting of alternative fuels, vehicle repairs, vehicle replacements, vehicle retrofits and hybrid engines. The mobile source may be selected from a group consisting of passenger cars, light trucks, large trucks, buses, motorcycles, off-road recreational vehicles, farm equipment, construction equipment, lawn and garden equipment, marine engines, aircraft, locomotives and water vessels.

== See also ==
- Emissions trading
- Carbon credit
- Flexible mechanisms
- Emission factor
- Joint implementation
- Chicago Climate Exchange
- European Climate Exchange
- European Union Emissions Trading Scheme
- International Petroleum Exchange
- List of futures exchanges
- Personal carbon trading
