= Richard L. Sandor =

American businessman and economist

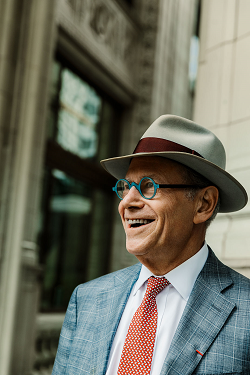
- Born: 1942 (age 83–84); New York City, United States
- Spouse: Ellen R. Sandor
- Children: 1 (Julie Sandor)

Academic background
- Education: Brooklyn College (BA), University of Minnesota (PhD)
- Doctoral advisor: Jacob Schmookler
- Influences: Ronald Coase

Academic work
- Discipline: Finance, Environmental Finance
- Notable ideas: Founder, Chairman & CEO of American Financial Exchange (AFX), Founder of Chicago Climate Exchange (CCX)
- Awards: Doctor of science, honoris causa, Swiss Federal Institute of Technology (ETH)

Richard L. Sandor is an American businessman, economist, and entrepreneur who is a pioneer for financial futures and became known as the father of carbon trading.

He is the former chairman and CEO of the American Financial Exchange (AFX) established in 2015. The AFX main product, the AMERIBOR benchmark index vyed to replace U.S. dollar Libor as a lending benchmark. Sandor is chairman and CEO of Environmental Financial Products LLC, which specializes in inventing, designing and developing new financial markets. He is widely recognized as the "father of financial futures" for his pioneering work in developing the first interest rate futures contract in the 1970s, when he served as chief economist and vice president of the Chicago Board of Trade (CBOT).

Sandor is also the founder of the Chicago Climate Exchange (CCX) – the world's first exchange to facilitate the reduction and trading of greenhouse gases. In 2007, he was named the "father of carbon trading" by Time Magazine for his work in designing, developing and launching CCX and affiliated exchanges. Among Sandor's academic roles, he is the Aaron Director Lecturer in Law and Economics at the University of Chicago Law School and an honorary Professor at the University of Hong Kong and the School of Economics at Fudan University. He formerly taught at graduate and undergraduate levels at several universities throughout California, Illinois, New York, China and England.

Sandor is known for asserting that the next financial revolution will be in the convergence of the financial markets and the environment. He is often credited for founding the field of environmental Finance. His first book Good Derivatives: A Story of Financial and Environmental Innovation, was published by John Wiley & Sons in April 2012.

== Early life and education ==
Sandor was born in New York in 1942. He received his Bachelor of Arts degree from Brooklyn College and holds a Ph.D. in economics from the University of Minnesota.

== Pioneer of Financial Futures ==
As a professor on sabbatical from the University of California, Berkeley in the 1970s, Sandor became the chief economist and vice president of the Chicago Board of Trade (CBOT). At the CBOT, Sandor not only pioneered the first interest rate futures contract, but the most widely traded and imitated interest-rate futures in the world, the Treasury bond futures contract. This revolutionized the field of finance and earned him the title of "father of financial futures." Sandor originally coined the term "derivatives" to describe the futures and options contracts that were traded on the Chicago exchanges. Its definition was subsequently expanded to include not only regulated products on futures transactions, but any customized product traded off the exchange, i.e. bilateral OTC transactions. Sandor was honored by the CBOT and the City of Chicago in 1992 for the creation of financial futures.

Sandor was also a strong proponent of electronic trading at a time when most exchanges favored open-outcry. In fact, he had presented the case and designed the platform for electronic trading as early as 1970 – even before the concept of electronic trading was patented. At Berkeley, he was the project leader of the California Commodity Research Project (CCARP), which looked at the feasibility of establishing a for-profit, all-electronic exchange in at the time when none existed.

At the CBOT, Sandor championed innovative financial instruments such as event-linked derivatives. Sandor served as vice chairman of the CBOT Insurance Committee and was the originator and co-author of the catastrophe and crop insurance futures and options contracts.

From 1991 to 1994, Sandor was chairman of the Chicago Board of Trade Clean Air Committee, which developed the first spot and futures markets for sulfur dioxide (SO_{2}) emission allowances and supervised the annual allowance auctions conducted on behalf of the U.S. Environmental Protection Agency. He also led the effort to create the Dow Jones Sustainability Index (DJSI) – the first global index that tracks the financial performance of leading sustainability-driven companies worldwide.

Sandor has held a variety of senior executive positions in financial service companies, such as Drexel Burnham Lambert, Kidder Peabody and Banque Indosuez. Sandor has served on numerous Exchange committees and boards, including the Chicago Board of Trade (CBOT), the Chicago Mercantile Exchange (CME), IntercontinentalExchange (ICE), London International Financial Futures Exchanges (Liffe) and the International Advisory Board of Marché à Terme International de France (MATIF). Sandor played an advisory role in helping Swiss Options and Financial Futures Exchange (SOFFEX) become the world's first electronic exchange. Teaming up with Boston-based Battery Ventures, Sandor also helped to promote Liffe's electronic trading platform and is credited for Liffe's successful contract – the universal stock futures contract. He also assisted the New York Mercantile Exchange (NYMEX) on the design of the options contract for crude oil.

Sandor has served several times as an advisor to the Commodity Futures Trading Commission (CFTC) on matters related to financial, energy and environmental futures.

== The Father of Carbon Trading ==
Using Environmental Financial Products as the incubator, Sandor founded the Climate Exchange PLC (CLE) family of companies. They include Chicago Climate Exchange (CCX); the Chicago Climate Futures Exchange (CCFE), a futures branch of the former; and European Climate Exchange (ECX), Europe's leading exchange operating in the European Union Emissions Trading Scheme (EU ETS) and the benchmark for world carbon prices. Additional global affiliates included the Tianjin Climate Exchange in China, the Montreal Climate Exchange in Canada and Envex in Australia. The emissions covered under the Chicago Climate Exchange were larger than that of Germany under the European Union Emissions Trading Scheme. It included 50 states and all major sectors of the U.S. economy. Its membership represented 17 percent of the companies in the Dow Jones Industrial Average, and 20 percent of the largest CO_{2}-emitting electrical utilities in the U.S., and 11 percent of Fortune 100 companies.

Sandor and EFP are turning their focus to the feasibility of a market-based mechanism as a tool to address water quality and quantity issues. This follows on extensive studies done by Sandor and his team while still at Chicago Climate Exchange (CCX). Sandor and his group of researchers studied the potential of a water quantity exchange for the state of New Mexico; the viability of a water market in the Great Lakes region; examined the potential benefits of implementing a rules-based exchange for water resources in Alberta, Canada; and helped develop a pilot nutrient trading effort in Pennsylvania.

In August 2002, Sandor was chosen by Time magazine as one of its "Heroes for the Planet" for his work as the founder of the Chicago Climate Exchange. Five years later, he appeared in Time magazine's fifth annual list of "Heroes of the Environment" for his work as "the father of carbon trading." In 1992 Sandor served as an expert advisor to the UN Conference on Trade and Development on tradable entitlements for the reduction of greenhouse gas emissions.

In June 2010, CLE was acquired by the IntercontinentalExchange (ICE).

== Recognition ==
In November 2004, Sandor was the recipient of an honorary degree of Doctor of Science (Honoris Causa) by the Swiss Federal Institute of Technology (ETH) of Zurich, Switzerland for his work on the design and implementation of innovative and flexible market-based mechanisms to address environmental concerns. In 2010, Sandor received the John H. Dales Memorial "Leadership in Environmental Markets Award" from the Environmental Markets Association.

Sandor is the recipient of the McGraw-Hill Energy Award (1999), the Life Time Achievement award from the Global Association of Risk Professionals (2001), and the Milken Institute's award for Distinguished Economic Research (2003). In May 2005, Sandor was named by "Treasury and Risk Management" magazine as one of the "100 Most Influential People in Finance." He is also the recipient of the 2008 Financial Management Association's Outstanding Financial Executive Award, and the Ernst & Young's Entrepreneur of the Year 2009 Award in the "green" category. In 2012, Sandor received the World Federation of Exchanges (WFE) Award for Excellence. He was selected for this award in recognition of his work at the epicenter of environmental and financial markets for more than four decades.

== Board affiliations ==
Sandor was a former director of American Electric Power (AEP), one of the largest utilities in the United States and of the Volatility Exchange. Sandor also served on the board of Clean Energy Trust, a Chicago-based not-for-profit, the Smithsonian Tropical Research Institute and Lincoln Park Zoo. He is an advisory board member for the Center for Financial Stability, a member of the Advisory Board of the Digital Dollar Project, a member of the Marie Selby Botanical Gardens Board of Trustees and a Senior Fellow at the Milken Institute. Sandor and his wife, Ellen Sandor, are collectors of photography and are involved in numerous civic and charitable activities. They are major benefactors of the Art Institute of Chicago. He also served as a trustee for the International Center of Photography, New York. Ellen is the founder and director of (art)^{n} and an advisory board chair of the Gene Siskel Film Center.

== Academic affiliations ==
Sandor is a member of the TERI School of Management Advisory Committee in India. Sandor previously taught at the University of California, Berkeley, Stanford University, Columbia University Graduate School of Business and at the Kellogg Graduate School of Management at Northwestern University, where he was the first Martin C. Remer Distinguished Professor of Finance.

== Philanthropy ==
On February 7, 2013, the University of Chicago Law School announced that Sandor and his wife Ellen R. Sandor are the principal donors to a $10 million endowment in law and economics at the University of Chicago Law School. The Sandors made the gift in honor of Sandor's mentor, Nobel Laureate Ronald Coase, Clifton R. Musser Professor Emeritus of Economics at the Law School. In their honor, the Institute for Law and Economics has been renamed the Coase-Sandor Institute for Law and Economics.

== Publications ==
Books

- Richard L. Sandor, Paula DiPerna, Carbon Hunters: Reflections And Forecasts of Climate Markets in the 21st Century. World Scientific, 2025
- Richard L. Sandor, Electronic Trading & Blockchain: Yesterday, Today and Tomorrow. World Scientific, 2018
- Richard L. Sandor, How I Saw It: Analysis and Commentary on Environmental Finance. World Scientific
- Richard L. Sandor, Nathan Clark, Murali Kanakasabai and Rafael L. Marques, Environmental Markets: A New Asset Class. Research Foundation Publications, January 2014. (also published in Chinese)
- Richard L. Sandor, Sustainable Investing and Environmental Markets: Opportunities in a New Asset Class. World Scientific. (also published in Chinese)
- Richard L. Sandor. Good Derivatives: A Story of Financial and Environmental Innovation. John Wiley & Sons. February 2012 (also published in Chinese)
- Richard L. Sandor. Speculating in Futures. Handbook for the Board of Trade of the City of Chicago. 1973

Academic publications

- Financial Innovation in China: The Tale of Establishing the Tianjin Climate Exchange, Part I. Presented at the Ronald Coase Conference on China's Economic Transformation, University of Chicago Law School, Summer 2008
- Fred D. Arditti and Richard L. Sandor. "A Word on Variable Patent Life". Journal of Industrial Economics, 1974
- Richard L. Sandor. "A Note on the Commercial Value of Patented Inventions." The Patent, Trademark and Copyright Journal of Research and Education. 1970.
- Richard L. Sandor. "Some Empirical Findings on the Legal Costs of Patenting." Journal of Business. University of Chicago Press. 1972.
- Richard L. Sandor, "Innovation by an Exchange: A Case Study of the Development of the Plywood Futures Contract." The Journal of Law and Economics. Volume XVI (1). The University of Chicago Press. April 1973.
- Robert C. Goshay and Richard L. Sandor. "An Inquiry into the Feasibility of a Reinsurance Futures Market." Journal of Business Finance. Volume V (2). 1973.
- Richard L. Sandor and Howard Sosin, " The Determinants of Mortgage Risk Premiums: A Case Study of the Portfolio of a Savings and Loan Association." The Journal of Business. University of Chicago Press. Volume 48 (1), January 1975.
- Joseph B. Cole and Richard L. Sandor. "Calculating the Hedging Layer for a Synthetic Reinsurance Contract." The Journal of Reinsurance 1993.
- Michael S. Canter, Joseph B. Cole and Richard L. Sandor. "Insurance Derivatives: A New Asset Class for the Capital Markets and a New Hedging Tool for the Insurance Industry." ISSN 1745-6622 Journal of Applied Corporate Finance. Fall 1997. (also published in the Journal of Derivatives Winter 1996)

Book chapters

- Richard L. Sandor. "Foreword." The Handbook of Financial Futures by Nancy H. Rothstein and James S. Little. McGraw Hill Publishing. 1984.
- Richard L. Sandor and Howard Sosin. "Inventive Activity in Futures Markets: A Case Study of the Development of the First Interest Rate Futures Market." Futures Markets: Modeling, Managing and Monitoring Futures Trading, edited by Manfred E. Streit. Blackwell Publishing. 1983.
- Norman Mains and Richard L. Sandor. "Financial and Commodity Futures Markets." Financial Handbook, edited by Edward Altman. John Wiley & Sons. 1985.
- Richard L. Sandor. "Interview." The Big Hitters by Kevin Koy. Chicago: Intermarket Publishing Corp.1986.
- Richard L. Sandor, "Financial Futures Markets." International Finance and Financial Policy, Hans R. Stoll (ed.), Quorum Books, 1989.
- Richard L. Sandor, "Finance Profile." Green at Work: Finding a Business Career that Works for the Environment by Susan Cohn. Washington DC: Island Press. 1992.
- Joseph B. Cole and Richard L. Sandor. "Opportunities For Hedging and Trading with Catastrophe Insurance Futures and Options." Chapter 11 in Advances in Synthetic and Derivative Products: Managing Risk and Increasing Profits in the US and Global Markets (eds. Robert A. Klein and Jess Lederman) 1993.
- Richard L. Sandor and Michael J. Walsh. "Environmental Futures: Preliminary Thoughts on the Market for SO2 Emission Allowances." Advanced Strategies in Financial Risk Management by Robert J. Schwartz and Clifford W. Smith Jr. New York Institute of Finance first edition. May 3, 1993.
- Richard L. Sandor, "Climate Change, Catastrophe Risk, and Global Response: Trading in Greenhouse Gas Emissions Offers the Best Solution to Insurers." The Strategic Dynamics of the Insurance Industry – Asset/Liability Management Issues, edited by Edward Altman and Irwin T. Vanderhoof. Salomon Center, New York University, Stern School of Business, 1996
- Richard L. Sandor. "Towards an International CO_{2} Entitlement Spot and Futures Market." Market Based Approaches to Environmental Policy, edited by Richard F. Kosobud and Jennifer M. Zimmerman. Van Nostrand Reinhold. May 1997.
- Sylvie Bouriaux, Robert B. Gallaway and Richard Sandor. "The Insurance Derivatives Market and Securitization." Alternative Investment Strategies, edited by Sohail Jaffer. Euromoney Books. 1998.
- Richard L. Sandor. "The Convergence of the Insurance and Capital Markets." Securitizing Insurance Risk: Strategic Opportunities for Insurers and Investors" edited by Michael Himick. AMACOM. May 1999.
- Richard Sandor. "A Limited-scale Voluntary International GHG Emission Trading Program as Part of the United States Environmental Policy in the 21st Century." Preparing America's Foreign Policy for the Twenty-First Century edited by David L. Boren and Edward J. Perkins. Norman: The University of Oklahoma Press. April 1999.
- Richard L. Sandor. "Introduction." Insurance and Weather Derivatives – From Exotic Options to Exotic Underlyings, edited by Hélyette Geman. Risk Books. September 1999.
- Richard L. Sandor and Michael J. Walsh. "Some Observations on the Evolution of the International Greenhouse Gas Emissions Trading Market." Emissions Trading: Environmental Policy's New Instruments edited by Richard F. Kosobud. John Wiley & Sons. January 2000.
- Richard L. Sandor, Michael J. Walsh and Rafael L. Marques. "Greenhouse-Gas-Trading Markets." The Royal Society, June 2002.

Articles

- Richard L. Sandor. "On the Interest Rate Futures Market: An Introduction to the Development and Use of the Chicago Board of Trade GNMA Contract." Federal Home Loan Bank Board Journal. September 1975.
- Richard L. Sandor. "The Interest Rate Futures Market." Commodities. September 1976.
- Richard L. Sandor. "From Infancy to Maturity." Futures World. January 1983.
- Richard L. Sandor. "Index Futures and the Adjustment of Risk." The American Banker. October 10, 1983.
- Richard L. Sandor. "When You're Trading Interest Rate Futures, Ignorance is Risk." ABA Banking Journal. April 1984.
- Richard L. Sandor. "Eurodollar Options Usher in a New Era." Futures and Options Magazine. September 1985.
- Richard L. Sandor. "Le MATIF: est-il un succes? (The MATIF: Is It a Success?)". Marches et Techiniques Financieres. September 1987.
- Richard L. Sandor. "Some Preliminary Thoughts on the Feasibility of a Pollution Allowance Futures Market." Prepared for the Coalition for Acid Rain Equality (CARE). October,1990.
- Richard L. Sandor, "Chicago Board of Trade Proposes Clean Air Futures for Emission Allowance Risk Management." Financial Exchange, Volume 10, Number 2. Chicago Board of Trade. Sept-Oct, 1991.
- Richard L. Sandor. "Three Men and a Market." MATIF Special. 1991.
- Richard L. Sandor. "Firsts and Founders." LIFFE 10 Year Anniversary Special. 1992.
- Richard L. Sandor. "Environmental Futures." Institutional Investor. December 1992.
- Richard L. Sandor. "CBOT Catastrophe Insurance Complex Key to Catastrophic Loss Management." Financial Exchange. November 1992.
- Richard L. Sandor, "Distributing Risk – Seeking New Sources for Capital", The Zurich Insurance Magazine, No. 10, Zurich, 1995.
- Richard L. Sandor. "Getting Started: Rationale for a Limited-Scale International Greenhouse Gas Emissions Trading Programme." Global Greenhouse Emissions Trader, Issue 2. September 1997.
- Richard L. Sandor. "A View from Dr. Richard L. Sandor". Guest Column for Reuters' Insurance and Derivatives Update. March 11, 1998.
- Richard L. Sandor. "Trading Gases". Our Planet: The United Nations Environment Programme Magazine for Environmentally Sustainable Development, Volume 9, Number 6. 1998.
- Richard L. Sandor and Jerry R. Skees. "Creating a Market for Carbon Emissions: Opportunities for U.S. Farmers." Choices, The Magazine of Food, Farm, and Resource Issues. American Agricultural Economics Association. First Quarter, 1999.
- Richard L. Sandor and Jerry R. Skees. "Market for Emissions." Trading the Future: Official Publication of the Futures and Options Association. March 1999
- Richard L. Sandor and Michael J. Walsh. "Kyoto or Not: Opportunities in Carbon Trading Are Here." Environmental Quality Management. Spring 2001

Sandor was a monthly contributor to Environmental Finance magazine of London, for the column How I See It, since 1999.

Conference/convention papers

- Richard L. Sandor. "In Search of the Trees: Market Architecture and Tradeable Entitlements for CO_{2} Abatement." United Nations Conference on Trade and Development. 1993.
- Berg, Ann, Joseph B. Cole and Richard L. Sandor. "Crop Insurance and Options: A Proposal for Market Architecture." Proceedings of the Conference Designing New Programs for Managing Farm Production and Price/Marketing Risk in the 21st Century: The Challenge for Agricultural Economists. American Agricultural Economics Association San Diego, California. August 1, 1994.
- Richard L. Sandor. "The New Generation of Reinsurance Products: Bridging the Gap Between Insurance and Financial Markets." Insurance and Invest Forum. Aachen Management Services. Dublin, Ireland. October 7, 1994.
- Joseph B. Cole, M. Eileen Kelly, Richard L. Sandor. "Combating Global Warming: Possible Rules, Regulations and Administrative Arrangements for a Global Market in CO_{2} Emission Entitlements." Prepared for the United Nations Conference on Trade and Development. December 1994.
- Richard L. Sandor and Michael J. Walsh. "Market Architecture, Quality Control and Performance Risk: Can the Commodity and Capital Markets Inform the Design of the Clean Development Mechanism?" Proceedings of the U.S.-Brazil Aspen Forum. University of Colorado, Denver. February 1999

== See also ==
- Chicago Climate Exchange
- Emissions trading
- European Climate Exchange
