= National Equities Exchange and Quotations =

Equities exchange in China

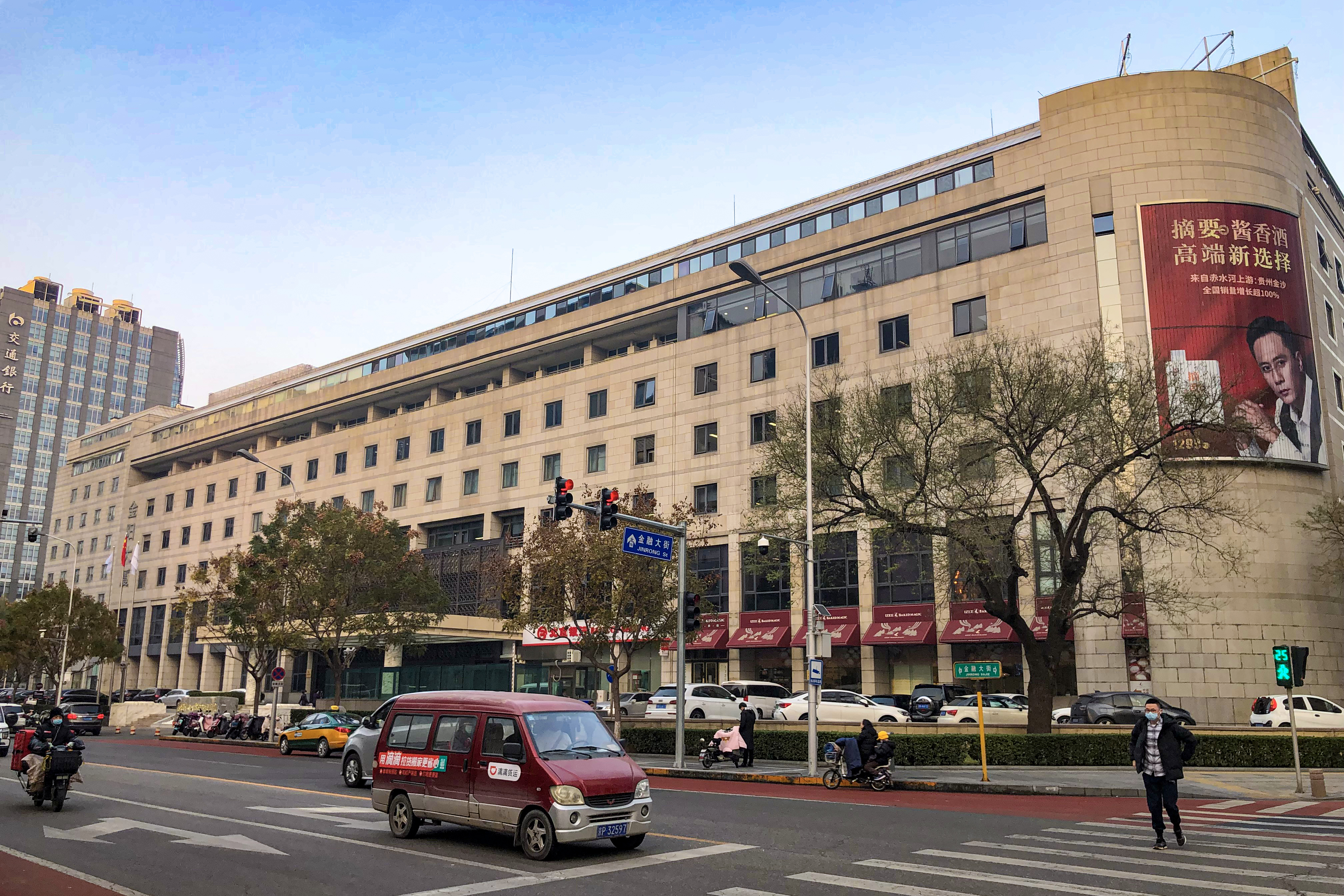
- Headquarters of the NEEQ
- Type: Over-the-counter exchange
- Location: Beijing, China
- Founded: 2012
- Currency: CN¥
- No. of listings: 10,209 companies
- Indices: NEEQ Composite Index
- Website: http://www.neeq.com.cn/

National Equities Exchange And Quotations
- Simplified Chinese: 全国中小企业股份转让系统
- Traditional Chinese: 全國中小企業股份轉讓系統
Transcriptions
Standard Mandarin
- Hanyu Pinyin: Quánguó zhōngxiǎo qǐyè gǔfèn zhuǎnràng xìtǒng

Alternative Chinese name
- Simplified Chinese: 新三板
- Traditional Chinese: 新三板
Transcriptions
Standard Mandarin
- Hanyu Pinyin: Xīn sānbǎn

Second alternative Chinese name
- Simplified Chinese: 股转系统
- Traditional Chinese: 股轉系統
Transcriptions
Standard Mandarin
- Hanyu Pinyin: Gǔzhuǎnxìtǒng

Third alternative Chinese name
- Simplified Chinese: 北京证券交易所
- Traditional Chinese: 北京證券交易所
Transcriptions
Standard Mandarin
- Hanyu Pinyin: Běijīng Zhèngquàn Jiāoyìsuǒ

The National Equities Exchange and Quotations (NEEQ) is a Chinese over-the-counter system for trading the shares of a public limited company (Chinese: 股份有限公司; lit. 'Company Limited by Shares') that is not listed on either the Shenzhen Stock Exchange or Shanghai Stock Exchange. The NEEQ exchange was also nicknamed the "New Third Board" (Chinese: 新三板) in China, as there were formerly two trading systems that the NEEQ replaced: STAQ and NET.

On September 3, 2021, Chinese leader Xi Jinping announced that NEEQ will be reformed and Beijing Stock Exchange will be set up. The new Beijing Stock Exchange will be a part of the NEEQ, based on the former NEEQ Select Board.

== Shareholders ==
Shareholders of National Equities Exchange And Quotations Co., Ltd:

- Shanghai Stock Exchange
- Shenzhen Stock Exchange
- Shanghai Futures Exchange
- China Securities Depository and Clearing Corporation
- China Financial Futures Exchange
- Dalian Commodity Exchange
- Zhengzhou Commodity Exchange

== Trading times ==
Trading takes place from Monday to Friday with the following times: 09:30-11:30 and 13:00-15:00. The exchange is closed on Saturdays, Sundays and statutory holidays.

== See also ==
- List of companies in the National Equities Exchange and Quotations
