= Soul (app) =

Chinese social media platform

- Developers: Shanghai Renyimen Technology Co., Ltd.
- Release: 2016
- Operating system: Android, iOS
- Website: www.soulapp.cn

Soul is a social platform and AI ecosystem company founded by Zhang Lu in 2016. The company is operated by Shanghai Renyimen Technology Co., Ltd. and headquartered in Shanghai, China. It focuses on common interests and gamified interactions.

== History ==
Zhang Lu started Soul app in 2016. It is operated by Shanghai Renyimen Technology Co., Ltd. In November 2017, Soul released its recommendation system's 2.0 version and introduced Soul Square and Planet. In June 2018, Soul introduced voice chat and drew attention from Gen Z. In December 2018, Soul had nearly 10 million monthly active users. In 2019, Soul allowed users to DIY their avatars and introduced Facekini for avatar video calls. Also, it introduced Teen Mode and set restrictions for the users aged below 18. Soul launched Audio Partyroom in 2020. In June 2022, Soul filed for its HK IPO with China International Capital Corporation. In 2023, Soul Made the Hurun Global Unicorn Index.

In November 2025, Soulgate Inc., the operator of Soul App, refiled for a Hong Kong listing. The company reported revenue of approximately RMB 1.85 billion in 2023 and RMB 2.21 billion in 2024, maintaining gross margins above 80%. According to its prospectus, the company has been profitable since 2023, with adjusted net profit of about 337.3 million yuan ($47.7 million) in 2024 and 286 million yuan in the first eight months of 2025. Daily active users reached roughly 11 million during 2025, supported by virtual gifting and subscription-based revenue models. Tencent remained the largest shareholder, holding 49.9 percent of the company. CITIC Securities acted as the sole sponsor for the offering. According to Asia Business Outlook, the company stated that funds raised would be used to support artificial intelligence research, user growth, international expansion, and content investment.

== Feature ==
Soul Test and Planet invite users to be grouped into thirty planets through five quick questions. Different planets represent different personas. Soul has a feature called Lingxi, which is an AI-powered relationship recommendation engine assisting users to build relationships. Users can customize their virtual identities by using Soul Avatar. With Soul Square, users can view and engage with the post of others. Based on common interest, Soul's interest group and Audio Partyroom are places where user can engage with others through text or voice chat to build in-depth connections in a themed group setting. Soul has also a feature called Soul Bell, if two users whose Soul Bells are both turned on come across each other within a certain distance, and they fit each other's interest graphs, their Soul Bells will ring and they can start chatting. Soul has some more features such as online games, NAWA POP, NAWA Store, AI chatbot.

== Operation ==
Soul operates in several markets around the world, including China, Japan, South Korea, Southeast Asia, and North America, etc.
