= Envex =

Defunct Australian financial energy trading company

- Type: Joint venture
- Industry: Financial services
- Founded: February 2008; 18 years ago
- Defunct: 2013
- Fate: Unknown
- Key people: Brian Price (non executive director); Dimitri Burshtein (non executive director); David Peniket (non executive director)
- Owners: Macquarie Group Limited; Financial and Energy Exchange; Climate Exchange PLC
- Website: envex.com.au (defunct)

Envex was an Australian financial services company that developed financial instruments for electricity trading and emissions trading under the Clean Energy Bill 2011 and other environmental markets in Australia. Its website was closed around 2013.

== History ==
The company was founded in February 2008 as a joint venture between Macquarie Group Limited and the Financial and Energy Exchange. In July of the same year Climate Exchange PLC, owner of the European Climate Exchange and the Chicago Climate Exchange, acquired a stake in Envex. Following the purchase of the European Climate Exchange by ICE, ICE also became the holder of Envex.

The core focus of Envex's work was to develop tradable contracts for Over-the-Counter and exchange-based trading to "enable trading in a range of environmental products" in the Australian markets. These include financial instruments related to the underlying units of the Mandatory Renewable Energy Target scheme, the Carbon Price Mechanism (also known as the Clean Energy Bill 2011), the Queensland Gas Scheme, Victorian Energy Efficiency Target and South Australian Energy Savings Scheme.

== See also ==
- Carbon Pollution Reduction Scheme
- Emissions Trading
- Mandatory renewable energy targets
- New South Wales Greenhouse Gas Abatement Scheme
