= Chinese stock market crash =

Chinese stock market crash may refer to:

- Chinese stock bubble of 2007
- 2015–16 Chinese stock market turbulence
