= PHSCologram =

PHSCologram is a registered trademark for barrier-strip and lenticular autostereograms made by Chicago-based art collective (Art)^{n} laboratory.

The barrier strip technique is similar in principle to lenticular printing, but with the use of a black line grid instead of lenticular lens to select which image is seen.

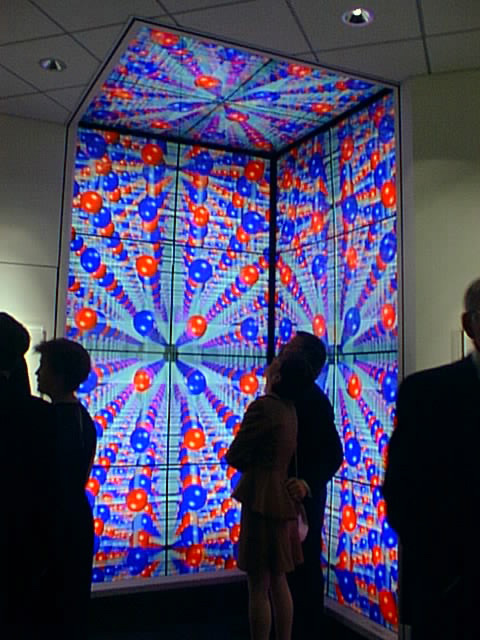
PHSColograms at the National Museum of Natural History

The capital letters in the name stand for photography, holography, sculpture, and computer graphics. The term was originally coined to refer to larger sculptural installations that included actual holograms as well as barrier-strip autostereograms, but in later years the name was taken to apply to digital autostereographic panels alone.

PHSColograms may be seen in permanent installations at the Museum of Jewish Heritage, the Hope Diamond exhibit at the Smithsonian Museum of Natural History, Chicago Midway International Airport, and in the collection of Elton John.

== Notable PHSCologram collaborators ==
- Ellen Sandor
- Ed Paschke
- Dan Sandin
- Carolina Cruz-Neira
- Tom DeFanti
- Donna Cox
- Miroslaw Rogala
- Charles Csuri
- Stephan Meyers
