= Yokohama Commodity Exchange =

Yokohama Commodity Exchange (横浜商品取引所) (Y-COM) was a futures exchange based in Yokohama, Japan which operated from 1998 to 2006.

== History ==
The exchange was formed in 1998 from the merger of the Yokohama Raw Silk Exchange (横浜生絲取引所) and the Maebashi Dried Cocoon Exchange (前橋繭糸取引所).

As of 1 April 2006 the exchange merged into the Tokyo Grain Exchange (東京穀物商品取引所), with silk and vegetables contracts moved there. The exchange's closure was due to declining trading volumes. Although 2005 and 2006 were boom times in commodity speculation in other areas like oil and metals, that action didn't extend to Yokohama.

Y-COM's end as a separate organisation was another in an ongoing consolidation of exchanges in Japan. In 1983 for instance there were 19 regional exchanges, with the closure of Y-COM there remained only 6.

== Operations ==
Trading was conducted in an "Itayose" auction-like system. There were four sessions each day, in which a single price was established for each contract month for each commodity.

Commodities traded were

- Potatoes — Japanese produced Dansyaku size "L"
- Japanese raw silk — 27 denier 3A produced in Japan
- Vegetables — cash settled average of several vegetable prices

In the past dried cocoons were traded.

== See also ==
- List of futures exchanges
