= ZCE =

ZCE may refer to:

- Zend Certified Engineer
- Zhengzhou Commodity Exchange
