= Rudolf Ferscha =

Austrian banker and business executive (born 1961)

- Born: 23 June 1961 (age 65); Vienna, Austria
- Citizenship: Austrian
- Education: University of Vienna (Law degree)
- Occupations: Banker business executive
- Years active: 1980s–present
- Known for: Expansion of Eurex into US markets; leadership of Frankfurt Stock Exchange

Rudolf Ferscha (born 23 June 1961 in Vienna) is an Austrian banker and business executive who was previously an executive board member of Goldman Sachs Bank in Frankfurt and of Deutsche Börse AG, one of Germany's top 30 listed companies. He also served as CEO of Eurex and as Chairman of the Frankfurt Stock Exchange. Ferscha holds a law degree from the University of Vienna.

== Career ==
=== Early career ===
Originally a banking and corporate finance lawyer in Vienna. He became a managing director of EFB, Erste Finanz-Beratung, a subsidiary of Erste Bank, in 1988, advising on international project finance and corporate finance. From 1990 to 1997 Ferscha was running Erste Bank's London office, including capital markets and derivatives trading subsidiary First Austrian International, an FSA regulated securities house. Ferscha became responsible for group-wide treasury and asset/liability management of Erste Bank in 1994.

=== Goldman Sachs ===
In 1997 Ferscha joined the Goldman Sachs Group LLP, initially in London, and in 1998 joined Goldman Sachs oHG Bank's management board in Frankfurt, as finance director and chief operating officer. He also became the co-managing director of their Frankfurt derivatives and warrants sales and trading.

=== Eurex/Deutsche Börse AG ===
Ferscha joined Deutsche Börse AG as an executive board member from Goldman Sachs, their investment bankers, shortly before the company's IPO. From 2000 to 2005 he was CEO of Eurex, then the world's largest Futures Exchange, co-owned 50/50 (profit distribution: 80/20) by Deutsche Börse AG and SWX Swiss Exchange respectively, and CEO of Eurex Clearing AG as well as CEO of the Swiss derivatives exchange Eurex Zürich. From 2003 he ran the Xetra division of Deutsche Börse AG and served as Chairman of the Management Board of the Frankfurt Stock Exchange. The Eurex and Xetra divisions accounted for more than half of Deutsche Börse AG's revenues.

Ferscha focused on profitability, global distribution, and on organic growth. The extension to foreign markets yielded market share gains in international index contracts like the EuroStoxx 50, as well as in Dutch, French and Italian equity options. In 2002 Eurex became the highest volume equity options exchange. The share of Eurex products sold to US customers grew from 5% in 2000 to 25% in 2005, as well as a profit growth from EUR 38m in 1999 to 175m in 2005. Ferscha propagated equal and open access to financial markets through a global liquidity network. He also proposed comprehensive regulation to capture systemic risk, as well as a balanced approach towards hedge fund regulation and a more inclusive approach to the over-the-counter markets.

Eurex developed its own over-the-counter electronic trading platforms; Eurex Bonds and Eurex Repo, and included 17 US brokers, clearers and banks in the shareholder base of EurexUS. The Futures Industry Association, Federal Reserve Chairman Alan Greenspan and German Finance Minister Hans Eichel supported its application to become a US-regulated exchange. In negotiating a 15% participation in The Board of Trade Clearing Corporation, Ferscha obtained Eurex's access to clearing directly in the US and the market-user shareholders of that company guaranteed EurexUS's turnover for the first three years. The shareholders of the Board of Trade Clearing Corporation voted for the Eurex deal and against an unsolicited take-over offer from the Chicago Board of Trade. Ferscha hired Goldman Sachs futures head Michael McErlean and the head of Chicago Mercantile Exchange's product development division Satish Nandapurkar to lead the Eurex US, 70% of which was sold to Man Group for $23.2 million 2 years later.

Ferscha reformed the allocation of specialist mandates on the Frankfurt Stock Exchange to individual brokers according to performance criteria and opened the specialist roles to firms headquartered outside Germany. When mandating the redesign of the interior of the Frankfurt Stock Exchange building in 2005 he preserved the traditional trading floor of the exchange and its trademark magnetic blackboard. He introduced the new market segment Entry Standard in to cater for smaller and less mature businesses, following the earlier closure of the "Neue Markt". The Entry Standard attracted 71 listings in its first year, becoming the largest alternative investment market in continental Europe.

Ferscha was reported to be a potential candidate to assume the Deutsche Borse AG CEO role after the company's CEO Werner Seifert and Chairman Rolf Breuer left in 2005, pressured by funds including TCI and Atticus Ferscha lost out on this role to Reto Francioni, then chairman of SWX Swiss exchange, Deutsche Borse's junior partner in Eurex. The hedge funds proposed Hypo Real Estate's Kurt Viermetz as Chairman, who hired, Francioni as CEO in November 2005.

In December 2005 Ferscha resigned from the Deutsche Borse Group, followed by several other senior management departures He was succeeded by Frank Gerstenschlager, who was given the responsibility for the Xetra-division (equities, funds and warrants), and also by Andreas Preuss who was given responsibility for the Eurex division (derivatives and clearing).

=== Gledhow Capital, Moody's, Flow Traders ===
In 2006 he became a Partner at Gledhow Capital Partners, and has been an independent board director at rating agency Moody's Investors Service Limited, Moody's Investors Service EMEA Limited, Moody's France SAS and Moody's Deutschland since 2013 as well as a member of the supervisory board of DEAG Classics AG. Since 2015 he has been a member of the supervisory board of Flow Traders, chairing the remuneration and appointment committee .

He served as an independent supervisory board member of 360 Treasury Systems AG until the company was sold to Deutsche Börse AG in 2016.

== Other interests ==
In May 2010 he was appointed to the Professional Oversight Board of the Financial Reporting Council, the independent UK regulator for corporate governance and corporate reporting.
