= Jintian Copper =

Chinese manufacturing company

Ningbo Jintian Copper (Group) Co., Ltd.
- Company type: Public
- Traded as: SSE: 601609
- Founded: 1986
- Founder: Lou Guoqiang
- Headquarters: Ningbo
- Key people: Lou Cheng (chairman)
- Revenue: ▲CN¥81.159 billion (2021)
- Website: www.jtcopper.com

Jintian Copper (Chinese: 金田铜业; SSE: 601609), whose full name is Ningbo Jintian Copper (Group) Co., Ltd., also known as Jintian Group, or simply as Jintian, is a Chinese manufacturing company of copper and semi-finished products. It was founded by Lou Guoqiang in 1986, and is one of the largest copper-processing manufacturers in China. Financed by Youngor Group, the company focuses on the non-ferrous metal processing industry. The firm is a member of CMRA, and is licensed by it to import scrap metal. The company's current chairman is Lou Cheng.

Jintian was previously listed on the NEEQ, and officially went public on the Shanghai Stock Exchange in April 2020. The company was ranked 166th on the 2022 Fortune China 500 List. Headquartered in Ningbo, it has established presences in Vietnam, Japan, France, Germany, the United States, among others. In addition, the firm was once the largest shareholder of Vancouver-based PBX Ventures.

== History ==
Jintian was established in 1986, initially as a copper bar producer. It was restructured into a joint stock company in 2001. In 2008, its copper output placed first in China at that time.

The company landed on the New Third Board in 2015. In 2017, it set up its first overseas production base in Vietnam. In 2018, its revenue reached 40.65 billion yuan.

The total amount of copper processed by Jintian surpassed one million tons in 2019. The trading of the company's shares started on the SSE in April 2020.
