= Asian market =

Asian market could mean:

- Asian financial markets, see List of stock exchanges and List of futures exchanges for a comprehensive list.
- Asian supermarket
