= Ellen R. Sandor =

American artist (born 1942)

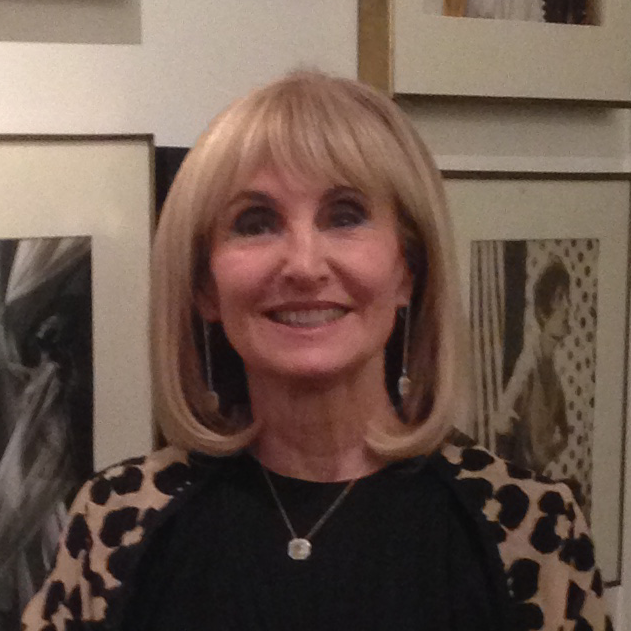
- Born: 1942 (age 83–84)
- Education: BA from Brooklyn College, MFA from the School of the Art Institute of Chicago (SAIC)
- Known for: New media art
- Notable work: PHSColograms
- Spouse: Richard L. Sandor
- Children: 1 (Julie Sandor)
- Awards: Honorary doctorate, SAIC (2012); Fermilab Artist in Residence (2016)
- Website: http://www.artn.com/

Ellen R. Sandor (born 1942) is an American new media artist. She is also founder of the Chicago-based (art)^{n}, a collective of artists, scientists, mathematicians, and computer experts. Sandor and (art)^{n} create sculptures that contain computer-generated photographic images that appear to be three dimensional.

She is best known for combining computer graphics, sculpture, and photography to visualize subject matter that includes architecture, historical events, and scientific phenomena such as the AIDS virus, Neutrinos, Microglia, and CRISPR.

== Education ==
Sandor holds a B.A. from Brooklyn College (1963) and an MFA in sculpture from the School of the Art Institute of Chicago (1975). In 2012, she received the Thomas R. Leavens Award for Distinguished Service to the Arts through Lawyers for the Creative Arts. In 2013, Ellen received the Gene Siskel Film Center Outstanding Leadership Award. She was also awarded an honorary doctorate of fine arts from the School of the Art Institute of Chicago in 2014.

Sandor was a visiting scholar of culture and society, National Center for Supercomputing Applications at the University of Illinois at Urbana-Champaign and a 2016 Fermilab Artist in Residence at the Fermi National Accelerator Laboratory.

== Work ==
In 1983 Sandor formed an artists’ group called (art)^{n}. They created a new art form, called PHSColograms (pronounced “skolograms”), which are 3D barrier-screen computer-generated photographs and sculptures. The term PHSColograms refers to a combination of photography, holography, sculpture and computer graphics. Some of (art)^{n}’s best-known scientific visualizations include a rendering of the AIDS virus cell as well as visualizations of the poliovirus, DNA, and the human brain.

Through her Chicago studio, (art)^{n}, Sandor collaborates with artists and technologists to create PHSColograms commissioned by art and science institutions. Sandor's work has been commissioned by the Jet Propulsion Laboratory, the Smithsonian Institution, and the Tech Museum of Innovation, among others. Her work is held in public and private art collections including the Art Institute of Chicago, the International Center of Photography, the National Academy of Sciences, the Musée Carnavalet, Paris, and the Victoria & Albert Museum, London.

Sandor and (art)^{n} have worked with a variety of artists including Ed Paschke, Karl Wirsum, Chris Landreth, Martyl Langsdorf, Donna Cox, Miroslaw Rogala and Claudia Hart. In addition, she and (art)^{n} have worked with scientists at the Scripps Research Institute, NASA, and the U.S. Army.

Sandor was honored by the Bulletin of the Atomic Scientists for her longstanding commitment to integrating art and science in 2017.

She is co-editor and contributor to New Media Futures: The Rise of Women in the Digital Arts (2018) published by the University of Illinois Press.

== Patents ==
Sandor is the co-holder of five U.S. patents, three for autostereography techniques and two for polymerization of lenticular images.

== Collecting and Philanthropy ==
Sandor and her husband, economist Richard L. Sandor, have assembled a private art collection with over 1,800 objects dating from the 1840s to the present. In 1988, 2001, and 2002 the Sandors were listed by Art & Antiques magazine as one of America's top 100 private collectors.

The Richard and Ellen Sandor Family Collection contains photographs, paintings, drawings, sculptures, and new media works focusing around themes such as 19th- and 20th-century icons, Paris between the wars, the American West, Hollywood portraits, and surrealism.

Ellen Sandor served on the board of governors for the School of the Art Institute of Chicago from 2003 until 2024 and is a lifetime trustee of The Art Institute of Chicago. She also served as chair of the Gene Siskel Film Center, 2003 until 2024. Ellen is a board member of Eyebeam Art and Technology Center in New York. She is also a member of the American Friends Musée d’Orsay et de L'Orangerie as well as on the board of the Fred Jones Museum of Art–The University of Oklahoma; John and Mable Ringling Museum of Art; and Asolo Repertory Theatre.
