= Chinese stock bubble of 2007 =

2007 dip in global stock markets

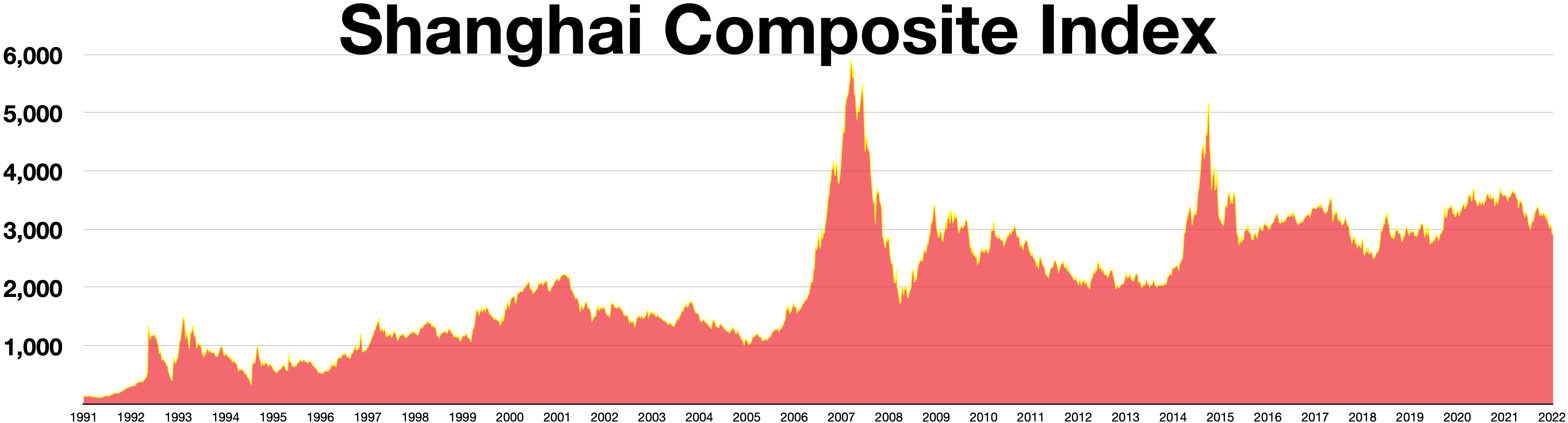
Shanghai Composite Index 1991- 2022

The Chinese stock bubble of 2007 (simplified Chinese: 中国股灾; traditional Chinese: 中國股災; pinyin: Zhōngguó gǔ zāi) was the global stock market plunge of February 27, and November 2007, which wiped out hundreds of billions of market value. After rumors that governmental Chinese economic authorities were going to raise interest rates in an attempt to curb inflation and that they planned to clamp down on speculative trading with borrowed money, the SSE Composite Index of the Shanghai Stock Exchange tumbled 9%, the largest drop in 10 years.

The plunge in Asian markets sent ripples through the global market as the world reacted to the 9% meltdown in the Chinese stock market. The Chinese Correction triggered drops and major unease in nearly all financial markets around the world.

After the Chinese market drop, the Dow Jones Industrial Average in the United States dropped 416.02 points, or 3.29% from 12,632.26 to 12,216.24 amid fears for growth prospects, then the biggest one-day slide since the September 11, 2001, terrorist attacks. The S&P 500 saw a larger 3.47% slide. Sell orders were made so fast that an additional analysis computer had to be used, causing an instantaneous 200-point drop at one point in the Dow Industrials.

But, Shanghai Composite then raised to peak 6,092 in October 2007, then plunged between November 2007-November 2008.

== See also ==
- Chinese financial system
- Chinese property bubble
- Commodity trading in China
