= Mercado Abierto Electrónico =

MAE
- Mercado Abierto Electrónico S.A.
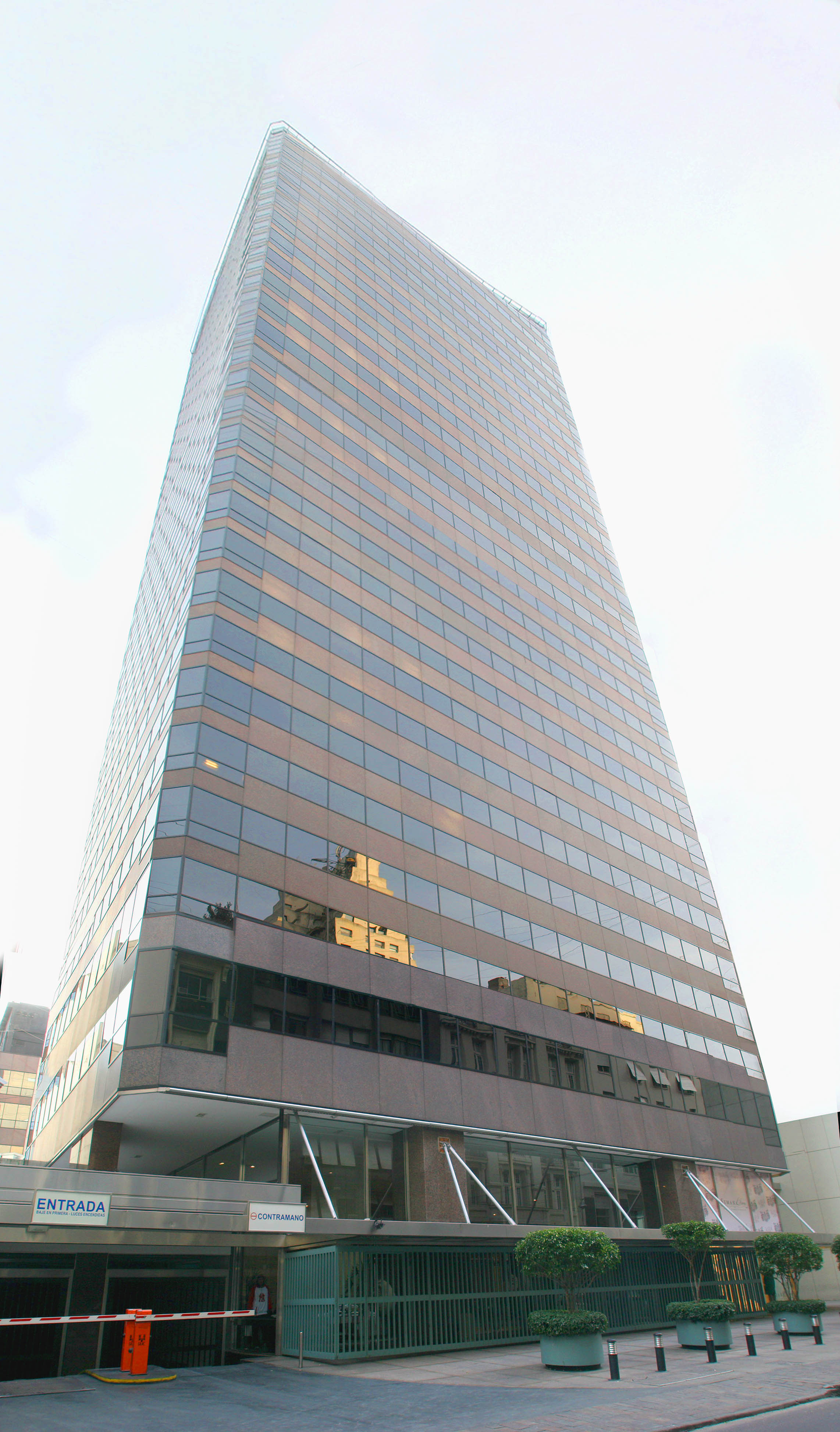
- Type: Stock Exchange
- Location: Ciudad de Buenos Aires, Argentina
- Founded: December 27, 1988
- Currency: Argentine peso, American dollar
- Website: MAE Home Page

Mercado Abierto Electrónico (MAE) is an electronic securities and foreign-currency trading market in Argentina. It is based on a modular electronic platform running on specific IT supports, where both government and private fixed-income securities, foreign currencies and swaps are transacted, as well as currency and interest rate futures. In addition, this technological support is used to trade bills of exchange and bonds issued by Banco Central de la República Argentina (BCRA) and for the initial public offering of bonds issued by the National State.

== History ==
Mercado Abierto de Títulos Valores (Open Securities Market) was founded in 1970 after the enactment of Law 17,811, and it began operations at mid-decade. In 1980, its operations expanded remarkably, reaching a broker count in excess of 450. MAE was founded in 1988. International agreements date back to 1999, when the Uruguayan Electronic Stock Exchange (BEVSA) gained access to the use of Sistema de Operaciones Electrónicas (SIOPEL) under an agreement that allowed, among other things, the technological complementation and joint operation of the software for electronic trading.

In 2000, an important agreement was signed with the Sao Paulo Stock Exchange BOVESPA and a license to use this system was granted. Two years later, three organizations – MAE, the Chilean Electronic Stock Exchange (BEC) and BEVSA – signed a Master Agreement for the Information and Transaction Interconnection of their respective markets. The interconnection of the Chilean, Argentinean and Uruguayan electronic markets has always been a goal, since these markets have transactional systems that operate over an open platform that lets them connect their systems and servers with other markets, regardless of the distance between them and the technology used.

In January 2004, MAE signed a technological cooperation agreement with Mercado de Valores del Litoral (MVL), one of the most important markets of the interior of the country. Under this agreement, the SIOPEL trading platform was installed for all of its members, representing an important regional integration. In 2005, MAE executed an agreement with the Colombian Stock Exchange (BVC) and the Bank of the Republic (Colombia) (BRC), under which the SIOPEL platform was used in the floating and fixed income markets from the beginning of 2006 in Colombia. That same year, the Buenos Aires Forward Market – Mercado a Término de Buenos Aires – signed an agreement with MAE to receive hosting to use SIOPEL for its futures and options transactions beginning in April 2007.

At the end of 2006, an agreement with the Costa Rica National Stock Exchange (BNVCR) was signed to use SIOPEL. This supported the consolidation of several screens into one, speeding up transactions and providing security that will strengthen their markets.

== See also ==
- Argentina economy
- List of stock exchanges
- List of American stock exchanges
