= China Stock Index Futures =

China Shanghai Shenzhen 300 Stock Index Futures, often abbreviated to "Hushen 300 Index" (Shanghai is commonly abbreviated in Chinese as Hù, and Shenzhen is abbreviated as shēn), designated by the commodity ticker symbol IF, is a stock market index futures contract traded in China Financial Futures Exchange (CFFEX). The notional value of one contract is RMB¥300 (US$1.00 = 6.83 RMB) times the value of the Shanghai Shenzhen 300 Stock Index. It is known to be the first stock index futures contract in China.

It was introduced by the CFFEX on April 16, 2010.

== Contract Specifications ==
Exchange: China Financial Futures Exchange (CFFEX)
Type: Index Futures
Underlying: Hushen 300 Index
Currency: Renminbi (RMB)
Contract: Size 300 RMB x Index
Tick Size: 0.2
Tick Value: 60 RMB
Pre-Open 1
Trading Session 1: 09:15 – 11:30
Pre-Open 2
Trading Session 2: 13:00 – 15:15
Pre-Open T+1 : No T+1 Session
Trading Session T+1: No T+1 Session
Last Trading Day: The Third Friday of the Contract Month
Final Settlement Day: The Third Friday of the Contract Month
Final Settlement Price
Settlement Type: Cash
Contract Months: current month, next-to current month, last month of the next quarter, last month of the second next quarter
First Trading Day: April 16, 2010
Position Limit: 10000 long or short position delta limit for all contract months combined
Initial Margin (outright): 15% of contract value (18% for far months)
Daily Price Limit: +/- 10% of previous close
Index Options: No
Exchange Symbol: IF
Notes: RMB 500,000 yuan minimum account size to begin trading.
