= CLSA =

Capital markets and investment group

CLSA Ltd.
- Formerly: CLSA, Credit Lyonnais Securities Asia
- Type: Subsidiary
- Industry: Diversified financials
- Founded: 1986; 40 years ago, in Hong Kong
- Headquarters: Hong Kong
- Number of locations: 20 (2018)
- Area served: Worldwide
- Key people: Youjun Zhang (chairman); Edward Park (Deputy CEO); John Sun (Deputy CEO & Group Head of FICC)
- Products: Financial services
- Services: Alternative investment, asset management, corporate finance and capital markets, securities and wealth management
- Number of employees: 1,800 (2018)
- Parent: CITIC Securities
- Website: www.clsa.com

CLSA Ltd. (formerly known as Credit Lyonnais Securities Asia) is a capital markets and investment group focused on alternative investment, asset management, corporate finance and capital markets, securities and wealth management for corporate and institutional clients.

Founded in 1986 by two former journalists, CLSA has its headquarters in Hong Kong and offices or representatives in 20 cities across the Asia-Pacific region, as well as Amsterdam, London and New York. In 2013, CITIC Securities, China's largest investment bank acquired CLSA for US$1.3 billion.

== History ==
In 1986, Winfull Laing & Cruickshank Securities began operations in Hong Kong, with former business journalist Jim Walker as chairman. The small brokerage was a 50-50 joint venture between the Woo Hon Fai family and Alexander Laing & Cruickshank.

The following year, Crédit Lyonnais acquired Alexander Laing & Cruickshank and, after various iterations, Walker's start-up emerged in 1989 as Credit Lyonnais Securities Asia (CLSA).

In 2003, Crédit Lyonnais, including CLSA, was acquired by Crédit Agricole, France's largest retail banking group, and CLSA remained part of Crédit Agricole until 2012. That year, Crédit Agricole sold a 19.9 percent stake to the Chinese firm CITIC Securities. On July 31, 2013, CITIC Securities acquired the remaining 80.1% of CLSA from Crédit Agricole and CLSA became wholly owned by Citic Securities.

Controversies that have hit the firm include the Securities and Futures Commission reprimand in May 2004; Asiamoney “vote-rigging” email in 2005; and Allen Lam insider-trading conviction in July 2009.

== Locations and staffing ==
With headquarters in Hong Kong, CLSA has over 3,000 staff located in 21 cities across Asia, Australia, Europe and the United States.

== Investors' Forum ==
In 2018, around 1,500 CEOs and CFOs from more than 570 corporations attended CLSA Forums to present to and meet with more than 1,900 institutional investors around the globe, while almost 5,200 private meetings were held.

== CITIC-CEFC bond scandal ==
In November 2016, CITIC CLSA acted as the sole bookrunner for CEFC Shanghai's US$250 bond issuance. CITIC CLSA hid from the market that the bond deal was only 60% subscribed at pricing. It manipulated the bond price in the secondary market in an effort to offload the 100mm USD bond CITIC CLSA held on its balance sheet.

In May 2018, CITIC Group announced they would repay ca 450 million euros owed by CEFC Europe to finance and banking group J&T within days but since the debt was not paid a week later, J&T announced it had taken over shareholder rights and installed crisis management at CEFC Europe. Several days later, CEFC Shanghai defaulted on $327 million in bond payments, and offered to make the payments six months after the maturity date.

To this day, CEFC Shanghai still hasn't paid the $327 million in bond payments. In October 2020, some retail CEFC bondholders in Hong Kong filed a complaint to the Securities and Futures Commission in Hong Kong against the bond's sole underwriter CITIC CLSA. The letter claims that CITIC CLSA had "blatantly" violated SFC's rules and regulations, committed deception and market manipulation and blatantly violated SFC's Conflict of Interest rules.
