= China Futures Association =

Membership organization in China

The China Futures Association (CFA) is a membership organization under the China Securities Regulatory Commission (CSRC), which regulates and supervises the futures industry in China. It is established as a nonprofit organization in which all Chinese futures companies are required to be members, and self-describes as a self-regulatory organization.

The CFA is one of three major membership organizations under the CSRC, together with the Securities Association of China (SAC) and Asset Management Association of China (ACAM).

== Overview ==
The CFA was established on 29 December 2000 in Beijing, in accordance with China's Regulations on the Registration and Management of Social Organizations. It is governed by the General Meeting of its members and by a standing authority, the council, composed of 17 professional committees: as of early 2025, these are respectively on (1) Brokerage Business, (2) Asset Management, (3) Derivatives Traders, (4) International Business, (5) Information Technology, (6) Self-regulatory Supervision, (7) Appeals, (8) Dispute Resolution, (9) Talent Cultivation, (10) Investor Education & Protection, (11) Research & Development, (12) Financial Technology, (13) Law, (14) Social Responsibility, (15) Cultural Development, (16) Talents Cultivation Fund Management Committee, and (17) Investor Education Fund Management Committee. The CFA's roles include education, training and organization of its membership; rulemaking, supervision and enforcement; mediation of disputes with customers; and representation of the membership's interests.

The CFA is led by its chairman, several vice chairmen, and the secretary general. The organization has 11 functional departments: (1) General Office, (2) Discipline Inspection Office, (3) Membership I, (4) Membership II, (5) Self-regulatory Supervision, (6) Innovation Business, (7) Investor Education, (8) Examination and Certification, (9) Research, (10) Training, (11) Information Technology.

As of end-2017, the CFA had 285 regular members, 5 special members, and 72 affiliate members, adding up to a total 362 members. Regular members include futures companies, securities firms, assets managers, risk management companies, and private equity funds. The special members are China's four futures exchange (DCE, SHFE, ZCE, and CFFEX) plus the China Futures Market Monitoring Center (CFMMC). Affiliate members include local associations, banks, software developers, and technology service providers among others.

== See also ==
- National Association of Financial Market Institutional Investors
- China futures market
