= China futures market =

Financial history

Futures markets in mainland China, initially deployed in 1990, have quickly established rapid growth as a result of transition to a market economy.

== History ==
In October 1990, China Zhengzhou Grain Wholesale Market was established in Zhengzhou, Henan Province. This is the first time that futures trading was introduced in China. Soon China's futures market started to boom. After more than 20 years development, China's commodities futures market has become one of the world's largest. Up to the end of 2011, there are 29 exchange traded futures products in China, more than 10 commodities such as corn, wheat, copper, steel, etc. and the total trading volume exceeded 300 trillion.

== Futures exchanges in China ==
There are four futures exchanges in China. Zhengzhou Commodity Exchange (ZCE, established in 1993), Dalian Commodity Exchange (DCE, established in February, 1993), Shanghai Futures Exchange (SHFE, established in 1999), and China Financial Futures Exchange (CFFEX, established in Shanghai in September, 2006).

== Opening up of China's futures market ==
Historically, Chinese government has imposed strict restrictions to keep the foreign capital out of its financial industry. In recent years, however, China introduced many financial opening policies and foreign capital has begun to infiltrate into domestic futures companies in China. ABN AMRO and Galaxy Futures Co. set up the first joint venture futures company in China. JPMorgan Chase set up a joint venture futures company with Zhongshan Futures Co. Ltd. Goldman Sachs also attempted to take shares in Qiankun Futures Co. Ltd. Due to policy restrictions, the maximum foreign share of joint venture futures companies in China is 49%. However, for the futures websites in China, which are not under supervision of China Securities Regulatory Commission (CSRC), there is no restrictions regarding the percentage of shares foreign capital can hold.

== See also ==
- China Futures Association
