= Commodity trading in India =

Commodity trading in India has a long history. In fact, commodity trading in India started much before it started in many other countries. However, years of foreign rule, droughts and periods of scarcity and government policies caused the commodity trading in India to diminish.

In 2016, apart from numerous regional exchanges, India had Six national commodity exchanges namely, Multi Commodity Exchange (MCX), National Commodity and Derivatives Exchange (NCDEX), Indian Commodity Exchange (ICEX), National Multi Commodity Exchange (NMCE), ACE Derivatives Exchange (ACE) and Universal Commodity Exchange(UCX). In 2018 both National Stock Exchange (NSE) and Bombay Stock Exchange (BSE) launched trading in commodities.

The regulatory body was erstwhile Forward Markets Commission (FMC) which was set up in 1953. As of September 2015, FMC was merged with the Securities and Exchange Board of India, SEBI. After this merger, SEBI has ordered to exit many commodity exchanges.
