= European Climate Exchange =

The European Climate Exchange (ECX) managed the product development and marketing for ECX Carbon Financial Instruments (ECX CFIs), listed and admitted for trading on the ICE Futures Europe electronic platform. For a time it was a subsidiary of the Chicago Climate Exchange, but eventually became a sister company. Both companies as well as IFEX were owned by Climate Exchange Plc, a holding company listed on the London Stock Exchange's Alternative Investment Market, founded by Richard Sandor. A chief executive was Patrick Birley, son of archaeologist Robin Birley. While products were listed on the London Stock Exchange, the sales and marketing team was initially based in Amsterdam, the Netherlands, under its first CEO, Peter Koster, before moving to London in 2007. Climate Exchange Plc was bought in April 2010 by Intercontinental Exchange.

ECX provided a pan-European platform for carbon emissions trading, with its futures contract based on the underlying EU Allowances (EUAs) and Certified Emissions Allowances (CERs), which had attracted over 80% of the exchange-traded volume in the European market. ECX contracted (EUA and CER Futures, options and spot contracts) were standardised exchange-traded products. LCH.Clearnet was the designated clearing house prior to 2008; later, all trades were cleared by ICE Clear Europe.

More than 100 businesses, including companies such as Barclays, BP, Newedge, E. ON UK, Endesa, Fortis, Goldman Sachs, Morgan Stanley and Shell, signed up for membership to trade ECX products. Using a process called 'order routing, ' several hundred clients could access the market via banks and brokers without having to be members. ECX was bought out by its partner ICE Futures Europe in 2008.

== Protests ==
On 1 April 2009, Camp for Climate Action protesters set up a campsite and farmers' market outside the European Climate Exchange in Hasilwood House in Bishopsgate, City of London, to protest against carbon trading as a "false solution" to the problem of climate change.

On 23 July 2010, European Climate Exchange's website was targeted by hacktivists operating under the name of decocidio #ϴ. The website showed a spoof homepage for around 22 hours in an effort to promote the contention that carbon trading is a false solution to the climate crisis.

== See also ==
- Carbon credit
- Chicago Climate Exchange
- Emissions trading
- List of renewable resources produced and traded by the United Kingdom
- Kyoto Protocol
- List of futures exchanges
- Mobile Emission Reduction Credit (MERC)
