= Chicago Climate Exchange =

Greenhouse gas reduction and trading system

- Type: Stock exchange
- Location: Chicago, United States
- Founded: 2003
- Owner: Climate Exchange PLC
- Key people: Richard L. Sandor (founder)
- Currency: United States Dollar
- Volume: 680 million metric tons of CO_{2}
- Website: www.chicagoclimatex.com

The Chicago Climate Exchange (CCX) was a voluntary, legally binding greenhouse gas reduction and trading system for emission sources and offset projects in North America and Brazil.

CCX employed independent verification, included six greenhouse gases, and traded greenhouse gas emission allowances from 2003 to 2010. The companies joining the exchange committed to reducing their aggregate emissions by 6% by 2010. CCX had an aggregate baseline of 680 million metric tons of CO_{2} equivalent.

CCX ceased trading carbon credits at the end of 2010 due to inactivity in the U.S. carbon markets, although carbon exchanges were intended to still be facilitated.

== History ==
Until 2010 CCX was operated by the public company Climate Exchange PLC, which also owned the European Climate Exchange. Richard Sandor, creator of the Sustainable Performance Group, founded the exchange and has been a spokesman for it. The exchange traded in emissions of six gases: carbon dioxide, methane, nitrous oxide, sulfur hexafluoride, perfluorocarbons and hydrofluorocarbons. CCX started trading in October 2003, prior to the commencement of trading in the European Union through the ETS system.

The Valley Wood Carbon Sequestration Project, the first such project to be verified through the Chicago Climate Exchange, was the recipient of offset funding generated through a unique partnership, developed in 2008 by Verus Carbon Neutral, that brought together 17 merchants of Atlanta's Virginia-Highland shopping and dining neighborhood retail district to establish the first Carbon Neutral Zone in the United States.

IntercontinentalExchange (NYSE: ICE), a leading operator of regulated global futures exchanges, clearing houses and over-the-counter (OTC) markets, agreed to acquire Climate Exchange plc in January 2009, the acquisition was completed in July 2010 and was followed by an announcement that half of the company's Chicago-based workforce would be laid off due to inactivity in the U.S. carbon markets. The market value of the carbon credits had crashed, it was said, because legislation to mandate participation could not pass due to Republican opposition, while others pointed to "a flood of credits from offset project generators." In November 2010, the Climate Exchange stated that it would cease trading carbon credits at the end of 2010, although carbon exchanges will still be facilitated.

== Final trading position ==
The effective final value of a carbon credit (termed a CFI or Carbon Financial Instrument) was reached in November 2010 when the carbon credit price per metric ton of CO_{2} was between 5 and 10 US cents, down from its highest value of 750 US cents in May 2008. Trading reached zero monthly volume in February 2010 and remained at zero for the next nine months when the decision to close the exchange was announced.

Historic price fluctuations in 2004 vintage carbon credits on CCX

== Components of the trading system ==
The trading system had the following three parts.

1. The Trading Platform was a marketplace for executing trades among Registry Account Holders. For instance, National Farmers Union's Carbon Credit Program was a multi-state program that allowed farmers and landowners to earn income by storing carbon in their soil through no-till crop production and long-term grass seeding practices. Farmers Union had earned approval from the Chicago Climate Exchange to aggregate carbon credits. Farmers Union was enrolling producer areas of carbon into blocks of credits that were traded on the Exchange, much like other agricultural commodities are traded.
2. The Clearing and Settlement Platform processed all transaction information.
3. The Registry was the official database for Carbon Financial Instruments owned by Registry Account Holders.

== Participants ==
The exchange had more than 400 members ranging from corporations like Ford, DuPont, and Motorola, to state and municipalities such as Oakland and Chicago, to educational institutions such as University of California, San Diego, Tufts University, Michigan State University and University of Minnesota, to farmers and their organizations, such as the National Farmers Union and the Iowa Farm Bureau to the government-run passenger rail corporation, Amtrak.

== See also ==
- European Climate Exchange
- International Petroleum Exchange
- List of futures exchanges
- The Climate Registry
- Dow Jones Indexes
