= Taiwan Futures Exchange =

Futures exchange in Taiwan

Coordinates: 25°1′36.03″N 121°31′20.38″E

- Traditional Chinese: 臺灣期貨交易所
Transcriptions
Standard Mandarin
- Hanyu Pinyin: Táiwān Qíhuò Jiāoyìsuǒ
- Wade–Giles: T′ai²-wan¹ Ch′i²-huo⁴ Chiao¹-i⁴-suo³
Hakka
- Pha̍k-fa-sṳ: Thòi-vàn Khì-fo Kâu-yi-só
Southern Min
- Hokkien POJ: Tâi-oân Kî-hòe Kau-e̍k-só͘
- Tâi-lô: Tâi-uân Kî-huè Kau-i̍k-sóo

The Taiwan Futures Exchange (TAIFEX; Chinese: 臺灣期貨交易所; pinyin: Táiwān Qíhuò Jiāoyì Suǒ; Pe̍h-ōe-jī: Tâi-oân Kî-hòe Kau-e̍k-só͘) was established in 1998. It offers futures and options on major Taiwan stock indices, government bond futures, equity options and 30-day CP interest rate futures.

The development of Taiwan's futures market may be divided into two stages. In the first stage, foreign futures were allowed for trading; the second stage marked the creation of a domestic futures market. The Foreign Futures Trading Law was enacted in June 1992 to provide a legal basis for investors to trade at foreign futures markets. The Futures Trading Law was enacted in March 1997, which replaced the Foreign Futures Trading Law and established the legal guidelines for the domestic futures market. This paved the way for the establishment of TAIFEX in September of the same year.

Along the years the TAIFEX have sought to diversify its products seeking to offer more hedging vehicles for investors.

== Products introduction timeline ==
- 21 Jul 1998: The Taiwan Stock Exchange Capitalization Weighted Stock Index (TAIEX) futures.
- 21 Jul 1999: The Taiwan Stock Exchange Electronic Sector Index futures and the Taiwan Stock Exchange Finance Sector Index futures.
- 9 Apr 2001: The Mini-TAIEX futures.
- 24 Dec 2001: The TAIEX options.
- 20 Jan 2003: Equity options with physical settlement.
- 30 Jun 2003: The Taiwan 50 Index Futures.
- 2 Jan 2004: The Government Bond Futures.
- 31 May 2004: The 30-Day Commercial Paper Interest Rate Futures.
- 28 Mar 2005: The Electronic Sector Index Options and Finance Sector Index Options.
- 27 Mar 2006: The MSCI Taiwan Index Futures, MSCI Taiwan Index Options and Gold Futures (all US dollar-denominated).

== See also ==
- Economy of Taiwan
