= Miroslaw Rogala =

Mirosław Rogala is a Polish-born American video artist and interactive artist. He has worked in the areas of interactive art, video installation and live performance, post-photographic transformation, and musical composition.

== Education ==
- 1972–76 Studied at Panstwowa Srednia Szkola Muzyczna, (School of Music), Kraków, Poland
- 1979 Master of Fine Arts in Painting, Jan Matejko Academy of Fine Arts
- 1983 Master of Fine Arts in Video, School of the Art Institute of Chicago
- 2000 PhD in Interactive Arts, CAiiA-STAR Centre for Advanced Inquiry in the Interactive Arts, University of Wales, Newport

== Interactive Art ==
Rogala's first art work to receive widespread acclaim was his Pulso-Funktory, a pre-interactive mixed media installation created between 1975 and 1979 that contained pre-virtual interactive analogue components. An assemblage of six panels with neon lights and electronic sound effects, it allowed for up to six viewers at a time to interact with it by allowing them to switch between "off" and "on" settings. Although this work was produced to fulfill requirements for a master of arts degree in painting, it prefigured the direction Rogala's art was quickly to take. In the words of critic Frank Popper, "When Rogala moved from Poland to the United States in 1979, he remained attached to his early works, which inspired a need to search for a medium that could synthesize the intrinsics of individual media and the desire to seamlessly cross the boundaries of each medium without losing the intensity, density, and precision in an effort to continue the same idea in different media."

Obtaining a master of arts degree in video from the Art Institute of Chicago, Rogala continue to pursue his interest in expanded forms of interactive media. In 1994-95, he received a residency from the Zentrum für Kunst und Medientechnologie, in Karlsruhe, Germany. The culmination was an installation entitled Lovers Leap. Lovers Leap used two screens facing one another. The viewer's movement within the space triggered the images to change. Rogala's photographic component was of a street in Chicago that would, if the viewer provided the right conditions, jump or "leap" to video clips shot in Jamaica. Lovers Leap was first exhibited at the MultiMediale 4: das Medienkunstfestival des ZKM Karlsruhe, 13-21 Mai 1995. A related CD-ROM version followed.

Timothy Druckery has seen Lovers Leap as a major development in interactivity: "In the coupling of spatial and narrative forms ... the spatial becomes a sphere of activity, and the image a site of reflection." Similarly, Mark B. N. Hansen has grouped Rogala together with the artists Tamás Waliczy and Jeffrey Shaw, seeing them as key in developing new ways to present the digitized photographic images: "By explicitly staging the shift from the technical image to the framing function, the works of these artists literally compel us to "see" with our bodies." Or in the words of Lynn Warren, "All these images differ profoundly from a traditional photograph in that the viewer does not merely hold (or amplify, or mutate) them in his memory after the initial, static viewing, the viewer determines the very structure of the image by how he physically moves his body, hands, and eyes. This is the post-photographic image."

In 1996, Rogala produced Electronic Garden/NatuRealization, sometimes known as eGarden, an interactive sound installation created and produced for Sculpture Chicago (http://www.chicagosculptureworks.com/Welcome.html) '96. The work was placed in the center of Washington Square Park in Chicago, a site with historic significance as a place where soap box speakers of the early to mid-twentieth century would use their right of free speech and expound on and debate the issues of the day. By moving through a gazebo-like structure, the listener would trigger the playing of recordings of the words of both historic and contemporary speakers associated with the area. Between one and four recordings might play at a time, but they would be heard only if a visitor moved through the space. In the words of critic and theorist Sean Cubitt from his article "Miroslaw Rogala: Public, Publicity, Publication," "The primary concern is with the process of making spaces where democracy can be enacted, where mutuality and trust are fostered, and where the voices of the past can inform the struggles of the present".

Divided We Speak was exhibited at the Museum of Contemporary Art in Chicago in 1997. In this exhibit, audience members could carry wands that would trigger changes in image and sound content as they moved through the MCA's video gallery. It accompanied a performance work, Divided We Stand, described as an interactive media symphony in six movements, which linked the use of these wands to an event involving musicians and dancers.

Divided We Sing (1999) was commissioned by the Pittsburgh Center for the Arts and also used wand technology, with the participants' gestures triggering spoken words (from radio and voice over artist Ken Nordine) and sung music (from Urszula Dudziak and Jennifer Guo). Elaine King described it as follows, "The visitor becomes a performer, sharing a stage with wall illusory shadow dancers. Every time a visitor appears in Rogala's 'wand' theatre a fresh interactive performance emerges."

Divided We See, like Divided We Sing, was an offshoot of a larger Divided We Stand project. About it Rogala has written,

Divided We See is an artist's statement -- a virtual, artistic enactment of the contingent relationship between freedom and limitation --emphasizing the ways of uniting people through new, interactive technologies in physical and virtual space. ... Can or should a moral or social metaphor be constructed on the fact that far more energy is released by coming together (nuclear fusion) than coming apart (nuclear fission)?

== Video Installation and Live Performance ==
One of the strongest influences on Miroslaw Rogala's video creation was his work with the New York-based German video artist Dieter Froese, who had developed techniques for synchronizing multiple video channels to allow for simultaneous projections. These skills led to the creation of a number of video installation and theater pieces which could be shown with precise frame-to-frame coordination between or among the different channels.

Questions to Another Nation (1985) was a four-channel video piece in which the viewer was invited to watch four television monitors simultaneously. The work presented a kind of debate or interaction among the four video sources. Writing in the Chicago Reader, critic Chris Strayer described how "Rogala embraces modern technology without losing touch with meaning. He integrates Polish, English, and computer languages with real, laser, and computer images. Faces spread across monitors until they look two directions simultaneously."

Remote Faces: Outerpretation (1986) used seven synchronized channels of video, parallel to the seven days of the week, with two groups of three monitors flanking each side of a larger screen. With one side representing "pro" and the other "con," Rogala's playing with a dialogic structure continued and became even more complex when combined with elements of performance. The result was a 36-minute work of video theater. Colin Westerbeck of Artforum praised the way in which Rogala explored the ways in which video could be considered comparable to a language: "He probes the electronic image to see if it has, as they say in linguistics, inherent deep structures."

Macbeth: The Witches Scenes was part of a production of Macbeth directed by Byrne Piven and performed in November and December 1988 at the Noyes Cultural Arts Center in Evanston, Illinois. Writing in the Chicago Sun-Times, Lynn Voedisch has described it by saying, "It features swirling photography, witches who resemble street people, robots and synthetic speech. Watching it was like taking a wrong step into a malevolent future."

Nature Is Leaving Us was a "video opera" conceived and directed by Rogala and performed at the Goodman Theater in Chicago in October 1989. It involved three panoramic 6-foot by 8-foot video walls, with a total of 48 synchronized monitors, presented in conjunction with performances by actors, musicians, and dancers. It featured the singer Urszula Dudziak. Richard Christiansen of the Chicago Tribune wrote of it, "On this giant video canvas, Miroslaw Rogala has composed urban and rural images that rise up, fade out, dissolve, fragment, reduce, blow up, and spin like a top in an ever-changing miracle of computerized artistry."

In EdgeMode (1997), the artist collaborated with choreographer Shirley Mordine. Each dancer chose a newspaper text that Rogala then processed and projected, using two synchronized channels, onto the dancer's naked body during the performance.

== Post-Photographic Transformation ==
Since 1993 and throughout the first decades of the twenty-first century, Rogala has been involved in an ongoing series of still, mixed media, and video artworks for which he has transformed photographs and digital sources using Mind's-Eye-View 360-degree perspective software developed by Ford Oxaal. The Transformed City series works with pictures taken in cities such as Kraków or Istanbul. The Transformed Garden series presents still lifes of fruits and vegetables fragmented into unstable, dynamic compositions. Works from the latter series were published in late 2009 in a book entitled Transformed Garden and exhibited in Miroslaw Rogala--The Breath of an Image: Digital Photography and Media Works held at The Art Gallery of Plock in 2013. In the words of critic George Lellis, "Rogala ... essentially inverts the image, with the lines and colors from the edges of the frame moving to its center and the color and form of the central object ... being dispersed to the periphery of the frame. ... The individual images ... suggest a photographic cubism or futurism in which a plenitude of moments, perspectives, and attitudes are frozen into a single exuberant image that often seems to defy gravity." Recently Rogala has been experimenting with transformation of still images and digital video through the use of multiple exposures, embodying his concept of "zig-zag time."

Gardens of Negotiation is a four-screen video installation first exhibited at WRO Biennale held in Wroclaw Poland 2017. Using the image of the apple as a central motif, Gardens of Negotiation extended many of the ideas about contemporary encounters between nature and technology first presented in Nature Is Leaving Us. Animating the transformed imagery he had been exploring in his post-photographic works, Rogala juxtaposed on four screens swirling, often distorted images of apples, sunflowers, mushrooms, trains rushing past urban cityscapes, the Berlin Wall, and other subjects. Placing the screens in such a way that one of the screens would be hidden unless the viewer makes an effort to see it, Rogala encouraged the viewer to explore the art work in a kind of sculptural space. Music accompanying the projected images was by hyper-realist composer Noah Creshevsky, whose splintering and reconstruction of appropriated musical sounds created an aural parallel to the images. In the words of the text accompanying the installation, "Using monumental, four-screen projection, Gardens of Negotiation inverts (and negotiates between) our usual perceptions of what is inanimate and what is sentient, what is permanent and what is subject to decay."

== Musical Composition ==
Miroslaw Rogala has repeatedly told the story of how as a child his parents sold a cow to buy him an accordion and pay for private music lessons. The artist's undergraduate degree was in music and he has worked as a composer simultaneously to his efforts in the visual arts. Not surprisingly, Rogala wrote the music for Macbeth: The Witches Scenes and much of the music for Nature Is Leaving Us. He had utilized the sampled voice of Urszula Dudziak in many of his computer music compositions from the 1980s.

The City (1990) was a 15-minute composition for live and electronic string quartet with sound design and arrangements by Lucien Vector. It premiered at the Chicago Public Library Cultural Center in connection with the gallery exhibit Chicago Designs: Fashion, Photography, Architecture.

In February 2001 in Philadelphia, Michael Iber performed piano compositions by Miroslaw Rogala whereby the sounds from the piano would trigger responses from a computer that would in turn produce sounds of its own and display video images. These included Human Factor (1988), Lovers Leap (1991-1997), and Year of Passion (1997), all of which were scored for computer, synthesizer (and "granular synthesis"), and prepared piano with interactive video sequences.
