= Mercado a Término de Buenos Aires =

Buenos Aires, Argentina Futures and Options Exchange

Mercado a Termino de Buenos Aires (MATBA) is the Buenos Aires Futures and Options Exchange.

== History ==
MATba was founded in 1907. It was the first market to be established in Latin America. In its early history, it traded futures contracts on agricultural commodities and rapidly became one of the main grain markets in the world. In the 1920s, MATba's flaxseed price was the setting price for the flaxseed business worldwide. During the following decades, Argentina's economic measures led to a decline in the volume of transactions. In the 1990s, MATba got authorization to settle all transactions in US dollars and introduced options on futures contracts. In 1998, to better meet the needs of its members, MATba launched its electronic trading system, which has been upgraded several times, thus creating greater opportunities for the entire marketplace, and increased access to MATba products.

== Products ==
MATba is the largest agricultural futures & options exchange in South America. It trades futures (contract size 100 metric tons) and options (American style). Traded products include soybean, wheat, maize, sunflower, sorghum, barley, soybean oil and ICA MATba (Argentine Commodities Index). The latter is an index that comprises the market value of a portfolio selected according to the product's market share of the total MATba transactions. In 2012 Chicago Soybeans and Chicago Corn were launched after MATba signed an agreement with the CME Group to list their contracts on agricultural commodities. In January 2017 MATba signed an agreement with ROFEX to interconnect their trading platforms, so members of both exchanges could trade all the products listed at both Exchanges. Later that year, cattle and "mini" contracts on wheat, soybeans and corn were launched. In October 2018 MATba and Rofex started a merger process.

== US Dollar quotation ==
Contracts traded at MATba are quoted and settled in US Dollars.

== MATba Foundation ==
MATba also offers, on an ongoing basis, a number of educational and training programs through its Foundation. These cover a wide range of topics involving derivatives, strategies, fundamental and technical analysis, among other courses. MATba has strategic alliances with organizations, Exchanges, national and private universities to train and promote a better understanding of derivatives markets as an investment and hedge tool.
