= Dalian Commodity Exchange =

Chinese futures exchange

- Native name: 大连商品交易所
- Type: Non-profit institution (administered by CSRC)
- Industry: Financial
- Founded: 1993 as Dalian Commodity Exchange
- Headquarters: Dalian, Liaoning, China
- Key people: Li Zhengqiang, Chairman
- Products: Futures exchange
- Website: www.dce.com.cn

The Dalian Commodity Exchange (DCE; Chinese: 大连商品交易所) is a Chinese futures exchange based in Dalian, Liaoning province, China. It is a non-profit, self-regulating and membership legal entity under the China Securities Regulatory Commission (CSRC), established on February 28, 1993.

Dalian Commodity Exchange trades in futures contracts underlined by a variety of agricultural and industrial produce on a national scale. As of 2015, DCE has listed a total of 16 futures products, including corn, corn starch, soybean (gmo and non-gmo), soybean meal, soybean oil, RBD palm olein, egg, fiberboard, blockboard, linear low-density polyethylene (LLDPE), polyvinyl chloride (PVC), polypropylene (PP), coke, coking coal and iron ore.

Normal trading hours are Monday-Friday from 9 am to 11:30 am and 1:30 pm to 3 pm Beijing Time.

The DCE is a member of the China Futures Association.

== Structure and function ==
The exchange has the deepest liquidity pool among all Chinese Commodity Futures Exchanges. According to the Futures Industry Association, the bourse has been the largest mainland futures exchange by volume for eight years, half the domestic market share in 2007, and captures roughly 2% of global futures market share (including financial futures). A near-tripling in volumes of its benchmark corn future in 2006 saw the contract leapfrog the DCE soy complex to become the single-largest product, with the 65m traded, trailing only Nymex WTI Crude in the global commodity rankings. According to the Futures Industry Association, DCE is the second largest agricultural futures bourse in the world, with a 29% market share. In 2007, total trading volume and turnover reached 371 million contracts and RMB 11.97 trillion (US$1.67 trillion). As of November 2007, the exchange had 194 members – including 180 brokers, with a reach of more than 160,000 investors. Louis Dreyfus became the first foreign member in June 2006.

At present, soybeans, soy meal, soy oil corn, palm oil, linear low-density polyethene (LLDPE) futures are traded on the DCE. The introduction of LLDPE in 2007 also marks the first petrochemical futures contract in the country.

On August 20, 2007, China officially announced the Northeast Area Revitalization Plan (a national-level development strategy). In this Plan, the Dalian Commodities Exchange was named as a key player in developing the fourth economic region in China. The northeast area is a relatively untapped market space and is traditionally associated with an edge in natural resources such as crude oil, agricultural land, electricity and coal mining. Shipbuilding, port logistics & distribution networks, utilities and agriculture are the most notable sectors in the region.

== Development ==
In addition, DCE intends to increase its support to industries and develop corporate and institutional client group. As a Deputy to the 11th National People's Congress, Mr. Liu Xingqiang was calling on the government to allow the establishment of commodity futures funds in an attempt to draw more institutional investors balance into the country's burgeoning futures market. Currently Only 5 percent of investors in China's commodity futures markets are commodity producers and consumers, while the remaining 95 percent are private investors. He also is encouraging the government to let companies use money they borrow from banks for hedging in the future market, though not to allow those funds for speculation. DCE shall provide assistance to members in technology upgrading so as to improve their technical trading system.

The exchange shall intensify its efforts in following areas: a more efficient new commodity futures approval mechanism, promote the integration of futures transaction and cash transaction; increase the support of futures market to industries, and strengthen the link between futures market industries; conduct research on and develop option and commodity index futures products to promote the integration of commodities and financial products.

== History ==
Dalian Commodity Exchange (DCE) was established on February 28, 1993. Since the establishment, it been an important player in the production and circulation of mainland soybeans. Over the next decade of market ratification, DCE earned a reputation among investors for its financial integrity with prudent risk management and great market functionality in international price correlation, transparency and liquidity.

In the first few years after the introduction of commodity markets, new exchanges opened with wild abandon, and speculative volume ballooned. Soon a directive titled The Notice of Firmly Curbing the Blind Development of the Futures Market was launched.

In October 1994, the State Council rectified over 50 futures exchanges down to 15 futures exchanges, delisted 20 futures contracts (leaving 35), began issuing licenses to futures commission merchants for the first time while lopping their number by over 70%, restricted trading on foreign futures exchanges, introduced new rules and regulations, and shifted the control of the exchanges from local governments to regulatory authorities. DCE's market share then ranked No. 9 in China with Dry kelp as a pilot product. DCE traded soybeans and corn back then.

Continued abuse in the market brought forth the Second Rectification in 1998, most of the surviving 15 futures exchanges were restructured, and subsequently closed. Three national level future exchanges emerged: Shanghai Metal Exchange, Dalian Commodity Exchange, Zhengzhou Commodity Exchange. The number of futures contracts was cut back further to 12 from 35, and more brokers were closed, leaving just 175 standing from the early 1990s peak of 1,000. Margins were standardized and regulations further toughened. Trading on foreign futures exchanges was further restricted to a small number of large, global entities. Soybeans, soy meal and beer barley were traded at DCE.

The post-rectification Chinese futures exchanges are financially independent of any government body. On the one hand, that means they have to make do without the public subsidies of the hyper-competitive pre-rectification days (in fact they had to pay back investments made by the local governments), but on the other hand rising volumes and the more rationalized industry structure has kept revenues quite healthy.

On July 17, 2000, DCE restarted trading soy meal, the first product listed since the last tumultuous rectification of China's futures exchanges. Until 2004, soy meal futures had been one of the most rapidly developing futures contract at China's futures market.

On March 15, 2002, DCE started trading No.1 soybeans futures (Non-GMO soybeans). It quickly became the largest agricultural futures contract in China and the largest Non-GMO soybeans futures contract in the world half a year later. According to the Futures Industry Association, Dalian's soybean futures volume quickly became the second largest in the world. A cointegration relationship exists for Dalian Commodity Exchange and Chicago Board of Trade (CBOT) soybean futures prices.

On September 22, 2004, DCE started trading corn futures. On December 22, DCE started trading No.2 soybeans futures. According to FIA statistics of volume in 2004, DCE ranks No.8 among international futures exchanges.

On January 9, 2006, DCE started trading soybean oil futures.

On July 31, 2007, linear low-density polyethene (LLDPE) futures are traded on the DCE. The introduction of LLDPE in 2007 marks the first petrochemical futures contract in the country.

On October 29, 2007, RBD palm oil futures are launched on the DCE to complement the current edible oil futures structure.

China's economy more than doubled in size in the past decade, turning the country into the world's top user of commodities such as copper, soy and rice. Though the government says it wants more financial instruments to help companies hedge risks, regulators aim to avoid a repeat of the 1990s, when speculation caused prices to soar and some contracts to fail.

According to Wang Xue Qin, a noted expert on the Chinese futures market and also the vice general economist of Zhengzhou Commodities Exchange, in theory, a new contract can be listed upon approval by the CSRC. In practice, the CSRC won't approve a product unless a consensus has been formed by the State Council and almost any ministry or commission that has some interest in the product. For some products that means over 10 ministries and commissions have to weigh in before a new contract gets a green light.

Another aspect of the approval process that makes for cautious approval, if one were needed, is that regulators and others with some tie to the product demand from the exchanges a virtual guarantee of success. Unlike the western system where the exchanges are free to fail or look foolish, failure could mean loss of face and career risk for too many parties in China's hybrid system.

According to the management, there will be more new contracts, pending from the favorable development in terms of types of products, market awareness and quality of participation over the coming few years, as futures are a key risk hedging component to an economy that is becoming more market-oriented and subject to global trade.

== Realized Price and Predicted Price: Futures trading at work ==
Commodity Futures form an advanced clearing function for the physical commodity clearing. Each Futures contract would generate a particular pattern of cash flow and cash commitment at a given price between the counterparties. In a Futures contract, payments are being made all along the life of the contract, whenever the Futures price changes. This is called "mark to market". Concretely, these payments involve additions and subtractions from "margin accounts" held at the Futures clearinghouse. It is significant that both the long and short side have to put up margin, because at the moment the contract is entered, both are in a sense equally likely to lose and so equally likely to have to make a payment to the other side. By means of Margin Calls, Commodity Futures shifts future imbalances between cash inflows and outflows into the present. Financial crisis in the present can also arise when these future imbalances get so large that they disrupt the present.

At any moment, a particular pattern of cash flows and cash commitments resolves itself into a particular pattern of clearing and settlement. Deficit Agents in the trade will need to borrow cash from banks today to delay settlement of that Commodity Futures. Of course, banks will not hold this risk unless they are compensated by an expectation of profit. But by means of credit, current imbalances are pushed into the future where, hopefully, they can be offset against a pattern of imbalances going the other way. And the elastic availability of such promises to pay are the essential source of elasticity in the payment system. In some sense, the futures market works just the opposite from the credit market. The credit market operates to postpone settlement until a future date or dates, while the futures market operates to accelerate settlement to a present date or dates.

Futures contracts, like debt contracts, are in zero net supply in the aggregate economy. One person's long contract is another person's short contract. Further, the quantity of outstanding contracts, called the open interest, has no tight relation to the quantity of the underlying. It's an approximate measure of the elasticity of uncertainty relative to the convergence of price.

== Product Investment Guides ==
The DCE makes product investment guides publicly available on their website for corn, soybeans, soybean meal, soybean oil, RBD palm olein, LLDPE and PVC. The product guides give an overview about China's production and consumption levels for these products, as well as import and export numbers, price trends and trading patterns.

== Market Data ==
Market data for the daily, weekly and monthly prices of the DCE's futures contracts is available on the DCE website, as well as monthly and annual statistics. Comprehensive market data for the DCE is also available for free through Quandl with history going back up to nearly a decade for some futures contracts. The data can be downloaded in any format. Other distributors of market data for the DCE include Wenhua Information Systems Co, Beijing Compass Technology Development and the Shanghai GW Network.

== See also ==
- China futures market
- Economy of China

=== Lists ===
- List of Chinese companies
- List of companies in the People's Republic of China
- List of futures exchanges
- List of stock exchanges
- List of stock market indices
