= Futures Industry Association =

American trade association

The Futures Industry Association (FIA) is a trade association in the United States composed of futures commission merchants. A futures commission merchant is analogous to a broker; they are entities that accept orders and payment for commodity futures for execution on a futures exchange. The FIA states that it believes its regular members are responsible for more than 80% of the customer business transacted on US futures exchanges.
