= China Financial Futures Exchange =

Chinese futures exchange

The China Financial Futures Exchange (CFFEX; Chinese: 中国金融期货交易所) is a futures exchange established in Shanghai on September 8, 2006—with the approval of the State Council and the authorization of China Securities Regulatory Commission (CSRC). It is a joint venture of the Zhengzhou Commodity Exchange, Shenzhen Stock Exchange and the Shanghai Futures Exchange.

== History ==
=== 2006-2009 ===
The China Financial Futures Exchange (CFFEX) was established in Shanghai on September 8, 2006 with the approval of the State Council and the authorization of China Securities Regulatory Commission (CSRC). Entities involved in its founding included the Shanghai Futures Exchange, Zhengzhou Commodity Exchange, Dalian Commodity Exchange, Shanghai Stock Exchange, and Shenzhen Stock Exchange. As of July 2007, it was preparing for the launch of stock index futures and options, and studying on financial derivatives, with the aim of creating a derivatives exchange center. In early 2008, CFFEX had approved 65 members futures company, while being involved in "mock trading" on its exchange.

In early 2008, it launched the CSI 300 index futures, the first contract of CFFEX. Later, CFFEX introduced government bond futures and futures on the SSE 50 Index and the CSI 500 Index. The exchange has described plans for other financial derivatives such as other index futures, index options, and currency futures. CFFEX launched its first product by conducting trading systems testing and running a series of programs to educate investors about risks.

=== 2010-2025 ===
China introduced its first stock-index futures on April 16, 2010 through CFFEX, which served as host of the index futures. Initially, the exchange limited investors to institutions and wealthy individuals to curb risks in trading stock index futures.

In May 2022, during a seven week COVID lockdown, the exchange was allowed to resume work by Shanghai after being placed on a "whitelist." In July 2022, stock index futures and options based on CSI1000 started trading on the CFFEX. Guangzhou Futures Exchange, China's fifth futures bourse, opened in December 2022, with CFFEX as one of its shareholders. In 2024, the CFFEX banned Shanghai Weiwan Fund Management from opening stock index futures positions for 12 months, as part of a larger clampdown on quantitative trading. The CFFEX is a member of the China Futures Association as of 2025. In 2025, He Qingwen remained chairman of the China Financial Futures Exchange.

== System ==
Following the principle of higher starting point and higher standard, CFFEX constructed an electronic market which follows the trend of global development. CFFEX also has a multi-tiered members' clearing system, strict risk management policy and an organization structure like a corporation to improve its competitive strength and development potential.

== See also ==
- China futures market
