= Shanghai Futures Exchange =

Future exchange in Shanghai, China

The Shanghai Futures Exchange (SHFE; Chinese: 上海期货交易所) is a futures exchange in Shanghai, China formed from the amalgamation of the national level futures exchanges of China, the Shanghai Metal Exchange, Shanghai Foodstuffs Commodity Exchange, and the Shanghai Commodity Exchange in December 1999. It is a non-profit-seeking incorporated body under the China Securities Regulatory Commission (CSRC).

The trading floor is located in Lujiazui, in the Pudong district of Shanghai. It currently trades futures contracts in copper, aluminium, zinc, tin, nickel, lead, natural rubber, fuel oil, silver, and gold.

The SHFE is a member of the China Futures Association.

== Shanghai Metal Exchange ==
The Shanghai Metal Exchange (SHME), was established on 28 May 1992. SHME is a non-profit, self-regulating corporation. The exchange was created for trading in non-ferrous metals and currently contracts for several non-ferrous metals including copper, aluminum, lead, zinc, tin, and nickel.

SHME is located in the city of Shanghai and its geographical location bridges the time gap between London Metal Exchange and New York Mercantile Exchange markets, thus enabling traders across the world to have a 24-hour access to futures contracts of non-ferrous metals. SHME is currently the largest non-ferrous metals futures exchange in China and the third largest exchange of its kind in the world.

== Shanghai International Energy Exchange ==
The Shanghai International Energy Exchange (INE; 上海国际能源交易中心) is a subsidiary of the Shanghai Futures Exchange established in 2013. It was created for trading energy derivatives. Contracts include futures and options on commodities such crude oil, copper, low sulfur fuel oil, and rubber. The exchange's hours are 9 AM–11:30 AM and 1:30 PM–3:00 PM China Standard Time.

== See also ==
- China futures market
- List of futures exchanges
- List of stock exchanges
- List of stock market indices
