= Zhengzhou Commodity Exchange =

Chinese futures exchange

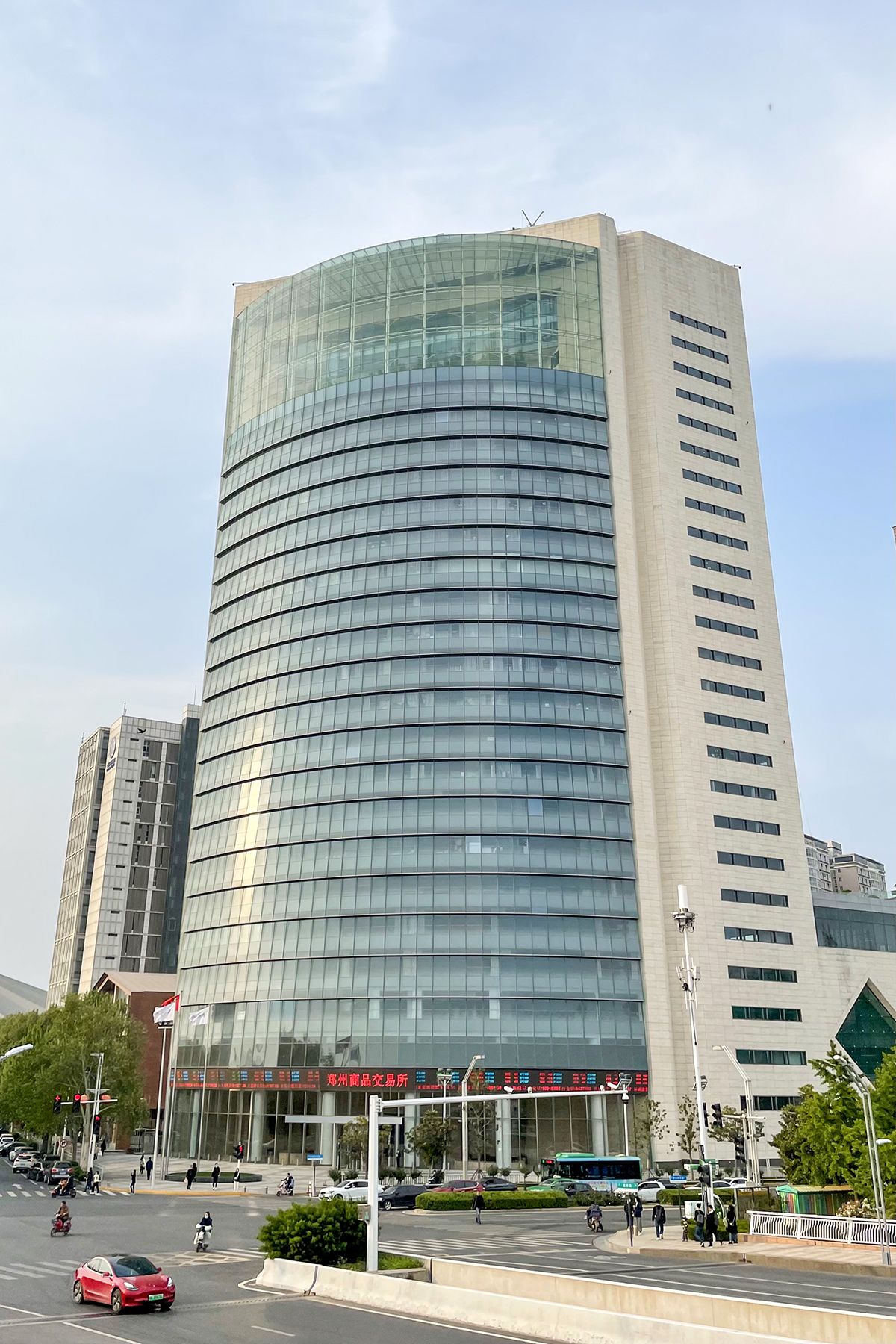
- Native name: 郑州商品交易所
- Type: Commodity Exchange
- Founded: 1990
- Headquarters: No. 30, Business Outer Ring Road, Zhengdong New Area, Zhengzhou City, Henan Province
- Products: Futures contract, Options
- Website: www.czce.com.cn

The Zhengzhou Commodity Exchange (ZCE), established in 1990, is a futures exchange in Zhengzhou, one of the four futures exchanges in China. The ZCE is under the vertical management of China Securities Regulatory Commission (CSRC).

The ZCE is a member of the China Futures Association.

== Products ==
ZCE specializes in agricultural and chemical product futures, including hard white wheat, strong gluten wheat, sugar, cotton, rapeseed oil and PTA, a petroleum-based chemical product.

== History ==
Zhengzhou Commodity Exchange was the first experimental futures market approved by the State Council, established on October 12, 1990. The ZCE, which started with forward contract trading, launched its first futures contracts on five agricultural products - wheat, maize, soybean, green bean and sesame on May 28, 1993.

In 1988, the Research Group of the Zhengzhou Grain and Oil Futures Market in China was established. In 1990, the State Council permitted the China Zhengzhou Grain Wholesale Market (CZGWM) to operate on an experimental basis. In March 1991, China's inaugural advance contract was executed under the organization and supervision of CZGWM. In 1992, Vice Premier Zhu Rongji conducted an inspection at CZGWM.

In 1993, the CZCE introduced futures contracts for wheat, corn, soybean, mung bean, and sesame. In 1994, contracts for peanut kernels, soybean powder, and red beans were introduced, and an afternoon session commenced. In 1996, Jiang Zemin, General Secretary of the Chinese Communist Party, President of China, and Chairman of the Central Military Commission, conducted an inspection of the CZCE.

In 2001, ZCE and ZCGWM were bifurcated into two autonomous entities. In 2003, the trading volume reached 49.82 million contracts, reflecting a 17.3 percent increase from the prior year. In 2006, white sugar futures contracts were introduced at the ZCE, which also sponsored the inaugural China (Shenzhen) Sugar Industry Peak Forum. In 2009, the ZCE conducted the opening-bell ceremony for early indica rice futures.

On December 1, 2020, Zhengshang received approval from the Monetary Authority of Singapore as a recognized market operator in Singapore.

== See also ==
- China futures market
- List of futures exchanges
- List of stock exchanges
- List of stock market indices
