= Buce =

Buce or BUCE may refer to:

- Belarusian Universal Commodity Exchange
- Birmingham City University
- Buče, a town in Berane, Montenegro
- Buče, Kozje, a settlement in eastern Slovenia
- Buçë, a village in southern Kosovo
