= KBB (disambiguation) =

KBB is Kelley Blue Book, a US automotive valuation and research company.

KBB may also refer to:

- KBB, a company that merged into the Dutch retail group Maxeda
- KBB Records, an English record label
- Commodity Exchange Bratislava (Komoditná burza Bratislava), a commodity exchange in Slovakia
