= UCX =

UCX may refer to:

- Universal Commodity Exchange, India's sixth national level commodity exchange
- UCX aircraft, a cargo aircraft
