= Payment for ecosystem services =

Incentives offered to farmers or landowners

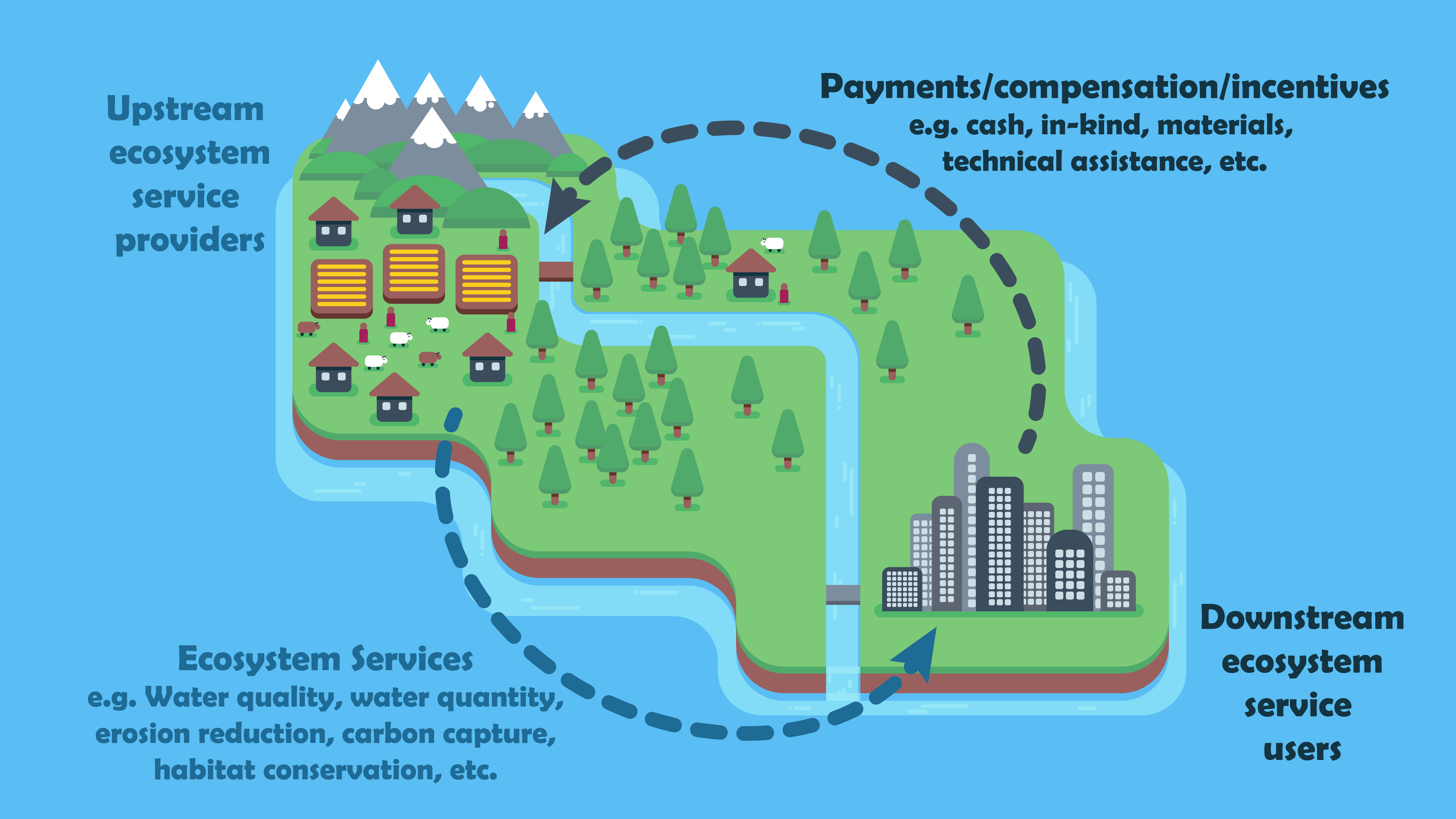
Payments for Ecosystem Services (PES)

Payments for ecosystem services (PES), also known as payments for environmental services (or benefits), are incentives offered to farmers or landowners in exchange for managing their land to provide some sort of ecological service. They have been defined as "a transparent system for the additional provision of environmental services through conditional payments to voluntary providers". These programmes promote the conservation of natural resources in the marketplace.

== Concept overview ==
Ecosystem services have no standardized definition but might broadly be called "the benefits of nature to households, communities, and economies" or, more simply, "the good things nature does". Twenty-four specific ecosystem services were identified and assessed by the Millennium Ecosystem Assessment, a 2005 UN-sponsored report designed to assess the state of the world's ecosystems. The report defined the broad categories of ecosystem services as food production (in the form of crops, livestock, capture fisheries, aquaculture, and wild foods), fiber (in the form of timber, cotton, hemp, and silk), genetic resources (biochemicals, natural medicines, and pharmaceuticals), fresh water, air quality regulation, climate regulation, water regulation, erosion regulation, water purification and waste treatment, disease regulation, pest regulation, pollination, natural hazard regulation, and cultural services (including spiritual, religious, and aesthetic values, recreation and ecotourism). Notably, however, there is a "big three" among these 24 services which are currently receiving the most money and interest worldwide. These are climate change mitigation, watershed services and biodiversity conservation, and demand for these services in particular is predicted to continue to grow as time goes on. One seminal 1997 Nature magazine article estimated the annual value of global ecological benefits at $33 trillion, a number nearly twice the gross global product at the time. In 2014, the author of this 1997 research (Robert Costanza) and a qualified group of co-authors re-took this assessment – using only a slightly modified methodology but with more detailed 2011 data – and increased the aggregate global ecosystem services provisioning estimate to $125–145 trillion a year. The same research project also estimated between $4.3 and 20.2 trillion a year of losses to ecosystem services, due to land use change.

PES has also been touted as a tool for rural development. In 2007, the World Bank released a document outlining the place of PES in development. But the link between the environment and development had been officially recognized long before with the 1972 Stockholm Conference on the Human Environment and later reaffirmed by the Rio Conference on Environment and Development. However, PES programs are usually not designed to be primarily poverty alleviation schemes, although they may incorporate development mechanisms.

Some PES programs involve contracts between consumers of ecosystem services and the suppliers of these services. However, the majority of the PES programs are funded by governments and involve intermediaries, such as non-government organisations. The party supplying the environmental services normally holds the property rights over an environmental good that provides a flow of benefits to the demanding party in return for compensation. In the case of private contracts, the beneficiaries of the ecosystem services are willing to pay a price that can be expected to be lower than their welfare gain due to the services. The providers of the ecosystem services can be expected to be willing to accept a payment that is greater than the cost of providing the services. The monetization of soil is also progressively recognised as essential for sustainable land-use planning and policy-making.

Payments for Agrobiodiversity Conservation Services (PACS)

A related concept aims to adapt Payments for Ecosystem Services to support agrobiodiversity conservation by smallholder farmers.

== Theoretical perspectives ==
There are three main theoretical perspectives concerning PES. The first is that of environmental economics, the second of ecological economics, and the third of those who reject the very idea of ecosystem services.

=== Environmental economics ===
The basic conceptualization of nature from the perspective of environmental economics is that manufactured capital can be used as a substitute for natural capital. The definition of PES provided by environmental economics is the most popular: a voluntary transaction between a service buyer and service seller that takes place on the condition that either a specific ecosystem service is provided or land is used in a way to secure that service. This definition is directly related to the Coase theorem, upon which PES is strongly based from the environmental economics perspective, which states that in a competitive market, in the absence of transaction costs and the presence of clear property rights, direct negotiation between private parties can lead to efficient outcomes. With this logic, a climate coalition can "buy coal" for conservation. However, in reality, transaction costs are virtually always present and the parties cannot always reach agreements on their own. One reason is that promising future payments are not time consistent. Another reason is the lack of sustained financing, which often leads governments to provide some type of funding assistance. The environmental economics theorists acknowledge that PES systems can resemble an environmental subsidy, complicating the strict Coasian backing.

=== Ecological economics ===
The conceptualization of nature as understood by ecological economics is that manufactured capital and natural capital are not exclusive or substitutable, but rather complementary. PES as understood by ecological economics comprises three schematic components. The first surrounds the importance of the economic incentive. This idea concerns the relative weight an economic incentive may carry when understood in relation to social, moral, or other non-economic incentives. The second component is directness of the transfer, referring to the extent of interaction between ultimate buyers and sellers. The most direct program would occur between one buyer and one seller, with no intermediaries. A relatively indirect program would remove the buyers and sellers from each other, placing intermediaries between them, commonly in the form of NGOs and governments. The third and final component is the degree of commodification. This addresses the extent to which the environmental service (ES) being provided can be specifically and clearly assessed and measured. Some ES may be relatively easy to assess, such as tons of carbon sequestered, while others may prove difficult.

=== Rejection of ecosystem services ===
Those who reject the idea of valuation of ecosystem services argue that nature should be conserved and valued for nature's sake, and that nature's value is impossible to quantify because its value is inherently infinite. They posit that the attempt to force the idea of ecosystem services into the market system leads to conservation only when it is deemed useful for human life, abandoning ideals environmental conservation when nature conflicts with human interest or simply does not affect human activity. PES programs have also been found to often rely on government or community engagement rather than operating solely as market mechanisms, complicating their classification as purely market-based instruments. There are also those who support the valuation of nature from a purely practical standpoint, expressed in the idea that "something is better than nothing." They realize and acknowledge the problematic nature of the quantitative valuation of nature but at the same time argue that practically, in a highly commodified society, it is a necessary measure.

Commodification of natural capital results in undervaluing ecological systems by not accounting for the innumerable wide-range services provided. PES may decrease in utility as 1) wealth becomes concentrated to the point that natural resource scarcity results in higher short-term value for unsustainable resource extraction, and 2) the long-term cost to engineer limited-range replacement services is externalized onto citizens. This occurs either through increased expense to the existing systems or as justification to privatize services for further profit. For example, a parent corporation can profit both from the exploitation of an ecosystem, and by engineering and operating the services formerly provided.

== Organizations and motives for incentivizing production of ecosystem services ==
Though the goal of all PES programs is the procurement of some sort of ecosystem service, the reasons why organizations or governments would incentivize the production of these services are diverse. For example, the world's largest and longest running PES program is the United States' Conservation Reserve Program, which pays about $1.8 billion a year under 766,000 contracts with farmers and landowners to "rent" a total 34,700,000 acres (140,000 km^{2}) of what it considers "environmentally-sensitive land." These farmers agree to plant "long-term, resource-conserving covers to improve water quality, control soil erosion and enhance habitats for waterfowl and wildlife." This program has existed in some form or another since the wake of the American Dust Bowl, when the federal government began paying farmers to avoid farming on poor quality, erodible land.

In 1999, the Chinese central government announced an even more expensive project under its $43 billion Grain for Green program, by which it offers farmers grain in exchange for not clearing forested slopes for farming, thereby reducing erosion and saving the streams and rivers below from the associated deluge of sedimentation. Notably, some sources cite the cost of the entire program at $95 billion. Many less extensive nationally funded PES projects which bear resemblances to the American and Chinese land set-aside programs exist around the world, including programs in Canada, the EU, Japan and Switzerland.

== Examples ==
=== North America ===
==== United States ====
In Jamestown, Rhode Island, United States, farmers usually harvest the hay in their fields twice a year. However, this practice destroys the habitats of many local grassland birds. Economists from the University of Rhode Island and EcoAssets Markets Inc. raised money from residents of Jamestown who were willing to help the birds. The range of investments was between $5 and $200 per person for a total of $9,800. This money was enough to compensate three Jamestown farms for the cost of reducing their yearly harvests and getting their hay from another source. In this way, the birds have sufficient time to nest and leave the grounds without being subject to a hay harvest. In this example, the farmers benefit because they only have to harvest their fields once a year instead of twice, and the contributors benefit because they value the lives of the birds more than the money they contributed to the project.

Salt Lake City, Utah, United States has managed the majority of its watershed since the 1850s through multi-jurisdictional regulatory mechanisms such as specifying allowable uses (and restricting them), and purchasing land or conservation easements. This long-standing, legally-defensible, yet often-overlooked strategy preserves ecosystem services, while still allowing widely utilized recreation including skiing, snowboarding, hiking, mountain biking, and fishing. Existing uses of the land are generally unaffected, and commercial enterprises are restricted to no- or low-impact tourism-related activities.

=== Central and South America ===
==== Costa Rica ====
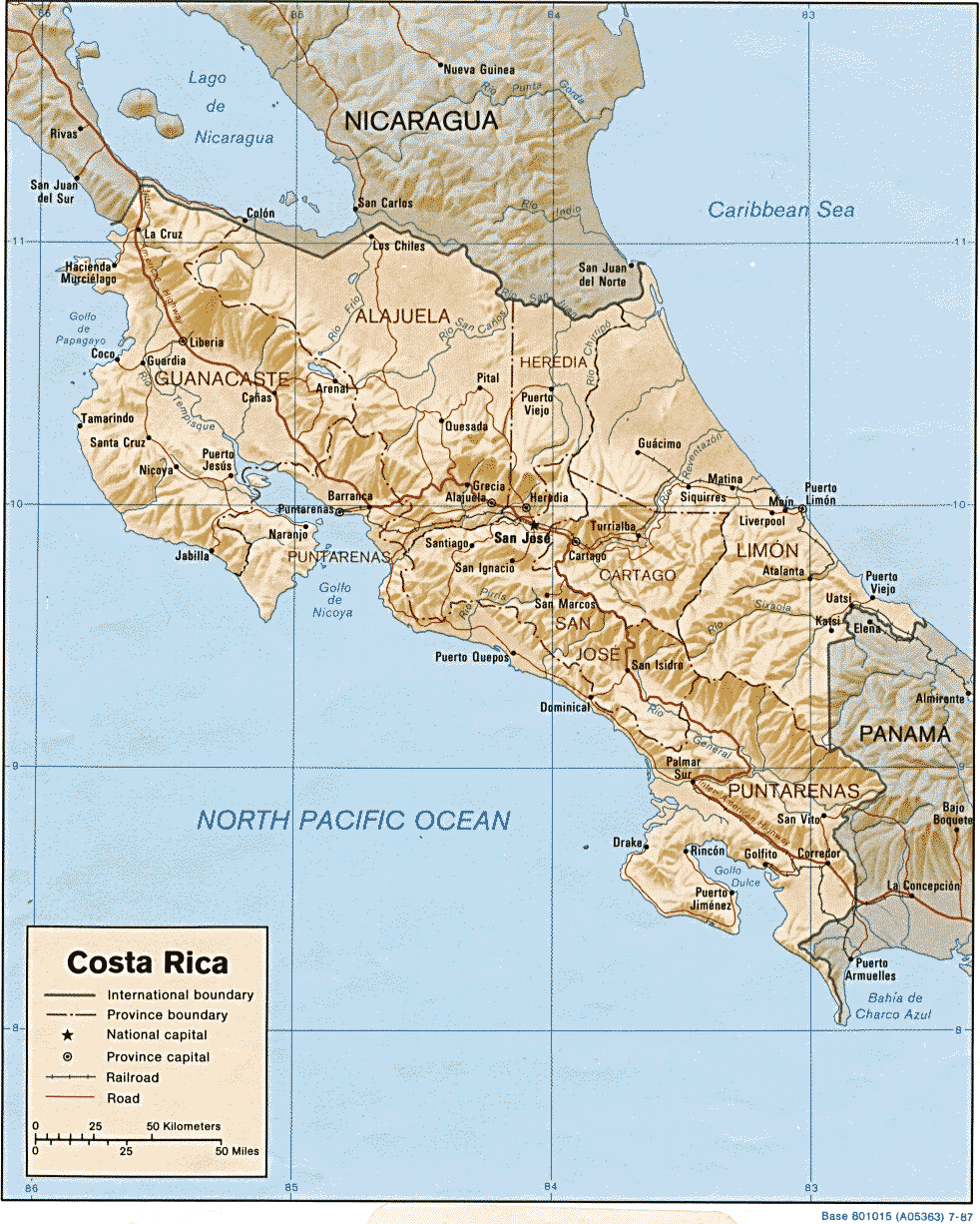
Costa Rica

Costa Rica's PES program, Pagos por servicios ambientales (PSA) was established in 1997, and was the first PES program to be implemented on a national scale. It came on the back of Forestry Law 7575 of 1996 which prioritized environmental services over other forest activities such as timber production, and which established the national fund for forest financing (Fondo Nacional de Financiamento Forestal), FONAFIFO. The PSA follows several years of different environmental programs in Costa Rica including the Forest Credit Certificate (Certificado de Abono Forestal, CAF) of 1986 and the Forest Protection Certificate (Certificado para la Protección del Bosque, CPB) of 1995. One of the main reasons for establishing the PSA program was to reframe conservation subsidies as payments for services. It explicitly recognized four environmental services: mitigation of greenhouse gas emissions, hydrological services, biodiversity protection, and provision of scenic beauty. During the early years of the PSA program from 2001 to 2006, it was funded by a World Bank loan and a grant from the Global Environment Facility (GEF) under the project name "Ecomarkets." From 2007 to 2014, the World Bank renewed its support for the program through a new project called "Mainstreaming Market-Based Instruments for Environmental Management." This support also generated FONAFIFO's Sustainable Biodiversity Fund (FBS), designed to target PES programs at owners of small pieces of land, indigenous communities, and communities with low development rates.

Financing of PSA activities was initially accomplished in part through a fuel tax established by Forestry Law 7575. The tax was used to flexibly target ecologically important areas. In 2006 a water tariff was introduced to provide additional funding. The water tariff has a relatively narrow application when compared to the fuel tax. Under the water tariff, holders of water concessions pay fees, a portion of which is transferred for use in the PSA exclusively within the watershed in which the revenues were generated. This removes the potential for revenues to be distributed as needed and has been criticized for concentrating funding in select areas, despite their relatively low ecological importance.

FONAFIFO acts as a semi-autonomous intermediary organization between service buyers and service sellers. As of 2004, FONAFIFO had contracted 11 different companies in agribusiness, hydropower, municipal water supply, and tourism to pay for the water services they receive. Since then, FONAFIFO has reached agreements with several more companies.

By the end of 2005, 95% of land enrolled in Costa Rica's PSA was under forest conservation contracts, covering 10% of the country. It is estimated that forest cover area increased from 2.1 million hectares in 1986 to 2.45 million hectares (48% of the country's total land area) in 2005. It is also estimated that the PSA prevented 11 million tons of carbon emissions between 1999 and 2005. Despite these successes, the PSA has been criticized for critical shortcomings. As it stands, the PSA payment system employs a flat rate cash payment to all participating landowners. This has resulted in large swaths of ecologically high value areas being left unenrolled in the program due to associated higher opportunity costs for land-use change not being adequately compensated for by the flat rate payment scheme.

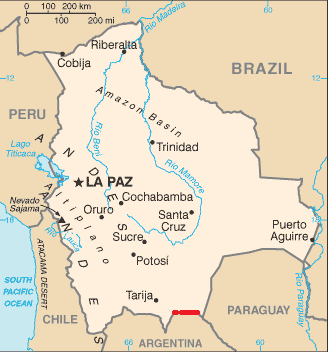
Bolivia

==== Los Negros, Bolivia ====
The program in Los Negros, Bolivia is a small user-financed program of combined payments for watershed and biodiversity services started by local NGO Fundación Natura Bolivia in 2003. The target area of the program is the watershed in Los Negros valley servicing the town of Santa Rosa and other downhill towns. By August 2007, 2774 hectares of native vegetation were enrolled in the program under 46 landowners.

Funding for the program was initially provided by the US Fish and Wildlife Service, before the Municipality of Pampagrande began making payments for the services One of the program's most unique aspects is the landowners' specific request that they be paid in-kind with beehives. They claimed that they wanted their compensation to last beyond a simple cash transfer. Along with the beehives, payment recipients are able to receive training in apiculture. It also allowed for those who prefer cash to sell their hives.

An organizational obstacle to the program is that some farmers fear that the scheme is just a way to dispossess them of their land. This was a major factor in deciding to be paid in-kind as it is perceived as less of an attempt at land appropriation. Natura is addressing this issue by maintaining a constant presence in the community and leveraging social networks to convince farmers of the program's benefits.

Another issue regards the service buyer of the program. The Municipality of Pampagrande has received some limited support from irrigators in contributing to the program payments. This structure essentially provides the environmental services to downstream users essentially free of charge. Natura is working to implement a strategy through which beneficiaries of environmental services will directly contribute to their maintenance.

Program evaluation has been impeded by two factors, namely a lack of baseline data and insufficient data as the program develops. These are important in order to establish the additionality of the program. This issue is not unique to Los Negros, however, as many programs suffer from a lack of sufficient monitoring and evaluation mechanisms.

==== Honduras ====
In Jesús de Otoro, Honduras, the Cumes River is the town's main source of clean water. Coffee producers were dumping their waste into the river upstream, polluting the source and directly affecting the consumers downstream. To solve this problem, the local Council for Administration of Water and Sewage Disposal (JAPOE) created a payment program to benefit coffee producers upstream and the town's inhabitants who lived downstream. The villagers downstream paid around $0.06 per household per month to JAPOE, who redirected the money toward the upstream farmers. The farmers complied with guidelines, such as construction of irrigation ditches, proper management of waste, and use of organic fertilizers.

Pico Bonito Forests, near La Ceiba, Honduras, is a mission-driven, for-profit venture between the Pico Bonito National Park Foundation and the EcoLogic Development Fund. Carbon credits are generated by planting native trees to capture, or sequester, carbon dioxide. The credits are then sold though the World Bank's BioCarbon Fund to countries aiming to meet their carbon emissions reduction targets. The project offers a unique business model because it is owned jointly by investors and the communities near the park. Community members earn income and share profits from implementing the sustainable forestry practices that capture carbon. By 2017, the project is expected to sequester from .45-.55 Mt of carbon through reforestation and agroforestry and up to an additional .5 Mt of carbon through avoided deforestation as destructive practices are replaced with sustainable practices.

==== Mexico ====
The Scolel Té program in Chiapas, Mexico, aims to create a market for positive externalities of shade-grown coffee plantations. Designed by the University of Edinburgh's Institute of Ecology and Resource Management along with the Edinburgh Centre for Carbon Management, using the Plan Vivo System, Scolel Té is a PES program under which farmers agree to responsible farming and reforestation practices in exchange for payment for carbon offsets. The NGO Ambio manages Scolel Té. Farmers submit their reforestation plans to Ambio, which judges their financial benefits and the amount of carbon sequestration associated with each plan. The farmers then receive payments from the Fondo BioClimatico, managed by Ambio. Funding for the Fondo BioClimatico comes from the sale of Voluntary Emissions Reduction (VERs) to private groups at a price of $13 per ton of carbon sequestered. Another citizen science project has monitored rainfall data that is linked to a hydrologic payment for ecosystem services project.

Movimiento El Campo no Aguanta Más! (MECNAM) is a rural Mexican organization that works for the campo and its representation. The organization was active in the early 2000s and contested many of the neoliberal policies taking hold in Mexico, including the implementation of the North America Free Trade Agreement (NAFTA). They also advocated for and won the expansion of national PES programs in Mexico as they believed it was an excellent way of engaging with and forming relationships within the state. It also allowed them to garner recognition of the rural areas and emphasized the value of rural economic stewardship and protection of the environment. MECNAM members were involved with the creation and design of PES programs which allowed them to add provisions for rural communities. This also permitted the discourse of the rights of nature and the implementation of indigenous sociocultural concepts of human-nature configurations. The addition of community input and agency as the result of local actors and activists works to commodify the environment in a bottom-up approach. While the environment becomes commodified, other aspects are also at play. The PES system works not only to monetize natural resources, but gives locals a platform to consider social and community concerns. The increased agency of locals who rely on the forests for survival and livelihood allows for compromise and negotiation between the needs of the community and the environmental concerns. The involvement of regional actors allows for them to tailor policies to their needs in order to best suit both the community and conservation efforts.

Fundo Monarca (FM), which is funded by federal funds and donations from the World Wildlife Fund (WWF) and Fundación Slim, initiated a PES program in 2001 to protect the "human-free" core forest of the Monarch Butterfly Biosphere Reserve (MBBR). This provided economic incentives for ejidos and comunidades (mestizo and indigenous communities, respectively, who were given communal usufruct land rights) to "conserve land" in their section of the core forest. It also was a method to address the income loss and social discontent caused by the repeal of communal logging permits due to the 2000 rezoning and expansion of the MBBR. However, the creation of the reserve undermined communal management institutions by reducing local land control and restricting human activity in the region, contributing to an increase in organized crime in the region. Some communities were denied their payment because they were categorized as "non-compliant actors," defined as communities with more than 3% forest change in their core land. This was despite the communities claiming that external logging by organized crime was the cause. Ethnographic evidence demonstrates that penalizing the communities for external logging results in residents patrolling the forest commons. This activity is made life-threatening by the violent actors associated with illegal logging. There are historical bases for community walks/patrols to protect the forest, such as faenas or rondas, but they are now organized to combat organized crime through methods such as performing them armed. There is no public acknowledgment that WWF/FM's zoning and PES program promotes this patrolling.

=== Africa ===
==== Hoima and Kibaale, Uganda ====
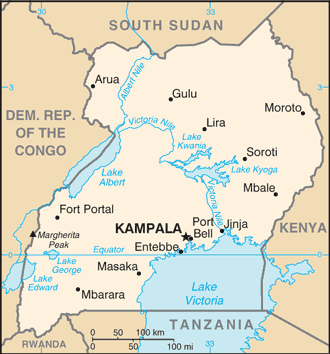
Uganda

The Hoima and Kibaale PES intervention took place from 2010 to 2013 and was especially unique because it was the first PES program set up specifically for a randomized control trial to empirically determine its impact on deforestation. In the treatment villages, owners of forested land were paid $28 per year over the course of two years for every hectare of forest land that was left intact, with the possibility of additional payment for planting new trees. The payment scheme amounted to 5% of average annual income for the typical participating landowner.

The program evaluation found there to be significantly less deforestation in participating villages (2–5%) than in control villages (7–10%), but the program did not carry on beyond the evaluation period, and it is assumed that previous forest practice would resume once landowners stop receiving program payments.

=== Europe ===
==== France ====
Beginning in the 1970s, smallholders in Vittel valley of the Vosges mountains adopted increasingly intensive agricultural practices, facilitated in part by new Common Agricultural Policy subsidies. As a result, aquifer nitrate concentrations began to increase, posing an existential threat to the lucrative Vittel mineral water brand. However, the company's options were limited for a number of reasons:

- Mineral water labeling regulations were much stricter than water quality laws, so the brand could not legally enforce its water quality requirements
- Aquifer nitrification was the result of nonpoint source pollution, and the contribution of any individual farmer could not be reliably quantified
- The company lacked the agricultural expertise to either identify the management changes needed to protect groundwater quality, or to estimate the opportunity costs of implementing those practices

As a result, a unique process of bargaining and negotiations unfolded between the farmers and the Vittel brand (acquired by Nestlé early in the process), which was supported scientifically by the French national institute for agricultural research.

The resulting arrangement—in which the company purchased some agricultural land while providing technical support and time-limited payments to farmers switching to more groundwater-friendly practices—is arguably the best-known example in the world of PES based on direct negotiations between ecosystem service providers and beneficiaries. Although widely regarded as case study in PES based on Coasean bargaining, aspects of the arrangement remain controversial, such as the creation of community grievances and the potential overexploitation of water resources.

==== United Kingdom ====
The United Kingdom government set up a Commission on Environmental Markets and Economic Performance in 2006 to make detailed proposals on enhancing the UK's environmental industries, technologies and markets. It was established following publication of the Stern Review (2006) to play an advisory role looking at "how the UK could make the most of the potential economic benefits of [a] transition to a low carbon, sustainable economy".

=== Asia ===
==== China ====
In Yunnan, a PES pilot project at and around the Lashihai Nature Reserve near Lijiang involved Conservation International China and included the design and testing of compensation and incentive mechanisms linked to land use and environmental services.
