= Commodity exchange =

Commodity exchange may refer to:

- Commodities exchange, any exchange where various commodities and derivatives products are traded.
- Commodity markets, for the markets trading on commodities in general.

== See also ==
- List of Commodity Exchanges
- New York Mercantile Exchange
