= East Bengal =

Former province of the Dominion of Pakistan (1947–1956)

Coordinates: 25.2192°N 90.9889°E

East Bengal مشرقی بنگال (Urdu) পূর্ব বাংলা (Bengali)
- Province of the Dominion of Pakistan
- 1947–1956
- Emblem

- Location of Bangladesh (then East Bengal) in green and present-day Pakistan (then the Western wing of the country) in light green
- Capital: Dacca
- Demonym: Bengali
- Population
  - 1955: 45,767,684
- Government
  - Type: Provincial government
- Monarch
  - 1947–1952: George VI
  - 1952–1956: Elizabeth II
- Legislature: Legislative Assembly
- History
  - Second Partition of Bengal: 15 August 1947
  - Renamed as East Pakistan: 29 February 1956
Preceded by	Succeeded by
Bengal Province; Assam Province	East Pakistan
- Today part of: Bangladesh (Note: See territorial exchanges between India and Bangladesh (India–Bangladesh enclaves).)

East Bengal (/bɛnˈɡɔːl/; Bengali: পূর্ব বাংলা/পূর্ববঙ্গ Purbô Bangla/Purbôbongo) was the easternmost and non-contiguous province of the Dominion of Pakistan, which covered the territory of modern-day Bangladesh. It consisted of the eastern portion of the British administrative Bengal province and the lion half of Sylhet district from the Assam province. East Bengal existed from 1947 until 1956, when it was re-structured as East Pakistan under the One Unit Scheme by the Constitution of Pakistan of 1956. East Bengal had a coastline along the Bay of Bengal to the south, and bordered India to the north, west, and east and shared a small border with Burma (presently known as Myanmar) to the southeast. It was situated near, but did not share a border with Nepal, Tibet, the Kingdom of Bhutan and the Kingdom of Sikkim. Its capital was Dacca, now known as Dhaka.

The Partition of India, which divided Bengal along religious lines, established the borders of the Muslim-majority area of East Bengal. The province existed during the reign of two monarchs, George VI and Elizabeth II; and three governors-general, Muhammad Ali Jinnah, Khawaja Nazimuddin and Ghulam Muhammad. Its provincial governors included a British administrator and several Pakistani statesmen. Its chief ministership was held by leading Bengali politicians.

East Bengal was the most populous and cosmopolitan province in the dominion. It was a hub of political movements, including the Bengali language movement and pro-democracy groups. The provincial legislature was the East Bengal Legislative Assembly.

== History ==
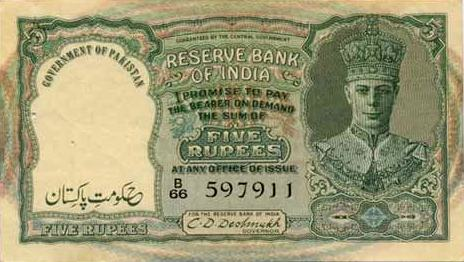
Rs. 5 banknote of colonial RBI issued under stampage of Pakistan

=== Mandates for partition ===
Between 1905 and 1911, a province called Eastern Bengal and Assam existed in the region as part of the British Indian Empire. The All India Muslim League was founded in the British province in 1906.

The All India Muslim League adopted the Lahore Resolution in 1940, which envisaged the creation of sovereign states in the Muslim-majority areas of eastern and northwestern British India. The League won elections in Bengal in 1946, receiving its largest mandate in the province.

In May 1946, Rohingya Muslim leaders met with Muhammad Ali Jinnah, and asked for a formal annexation of the Mayu region. Two months later, the North Arakan Muslim League also asked Jinnah to annex the region. Jinnah refused, saying he could not interfere with Burma's internal matters. Proposals were also made to the Burmese government but they were rejected.

The District of Sylhet in Assam Province also voted to reunite with the rest of East Bengal, and the Muslim League's campaign played a great role in facilitating this. A plebiscite was held which resulted in joining Pakistan. However, a large part of Sylhet's Karimganj subdivision was barred due to Abdul Matlib Mazumdar's delegation. The Chittagong Hill Tracts, which had a 97% non-Muslim population (mostly Buddhist), was awarded to Pakistan, by the Boundary Commission, due to it being inaccessible to India and to provide a substantial rural buffer to support Chittagong, a major city and port; advocates for Pakistan forcefully argued to the Bengal Boundary Commission that the only approach was through Chittagong.

As a result of these mandates, the Mountbatten Plan and Radcliffe Line established East Bengal as a province of the newly formed Dominion of Pakistan in August 1947.

=== Nazimuddin ministry ===
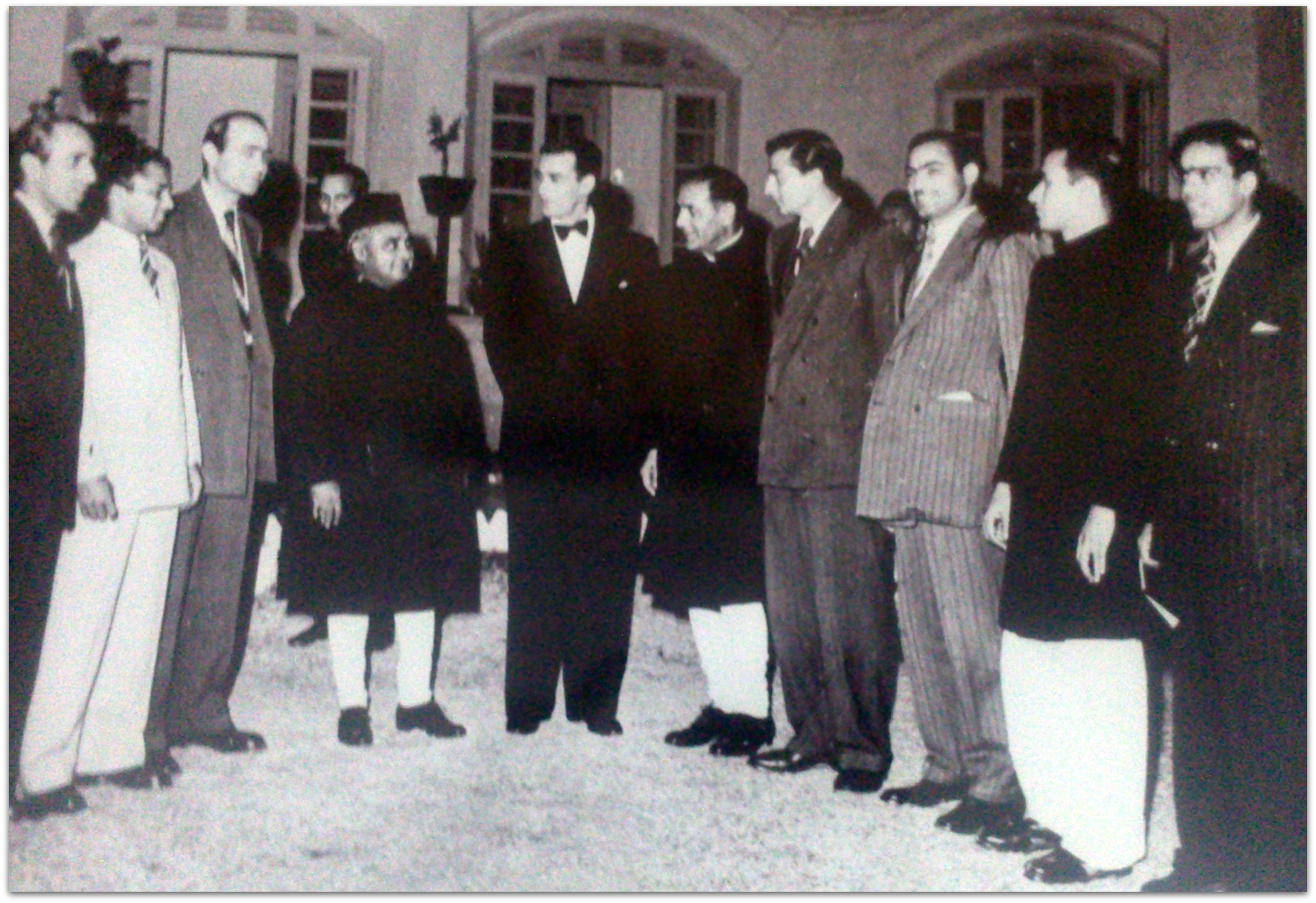
Sir Khawaja Nazimuddin with the Pakistan cricket team

Sir Khawaja Nazimuddin, a former prime minister of Bengal, was the first chief minister of East Bengal after partition. Nazimuddin was a senior leader of the Muslim League and a close confidante of Pakistan's founder Muhammad Ali Jinnah. Sir Frederick Chalmers Bourne was the first governor of East Bengal. Partition resulted in making many Hindus to leave East Bengal while Muslims from different parts of the Indian subcontinent migrated to East Bengal. The East–West Bengal border did not see as much violence as seen in the Punjab border between North India and Pakistan.

Jinnah made his sole visit to East Bengal as governor general in 1948. During a speech to students in Dacca University, he resisted demands to make Bengali a federal language. His refusal sparked fierce protests among East Bengalis who comprised the majority of Pakistan's population. The proposal for Urdu as the sole national language met with strong opposition in East Bengal, where Urdu considered rather alien, especially in light in Bengali's rich literary heritage.

When Jinnah died in 1948, Nazimuddin became the governor general of Pakistan.

=== Amin ministry ===
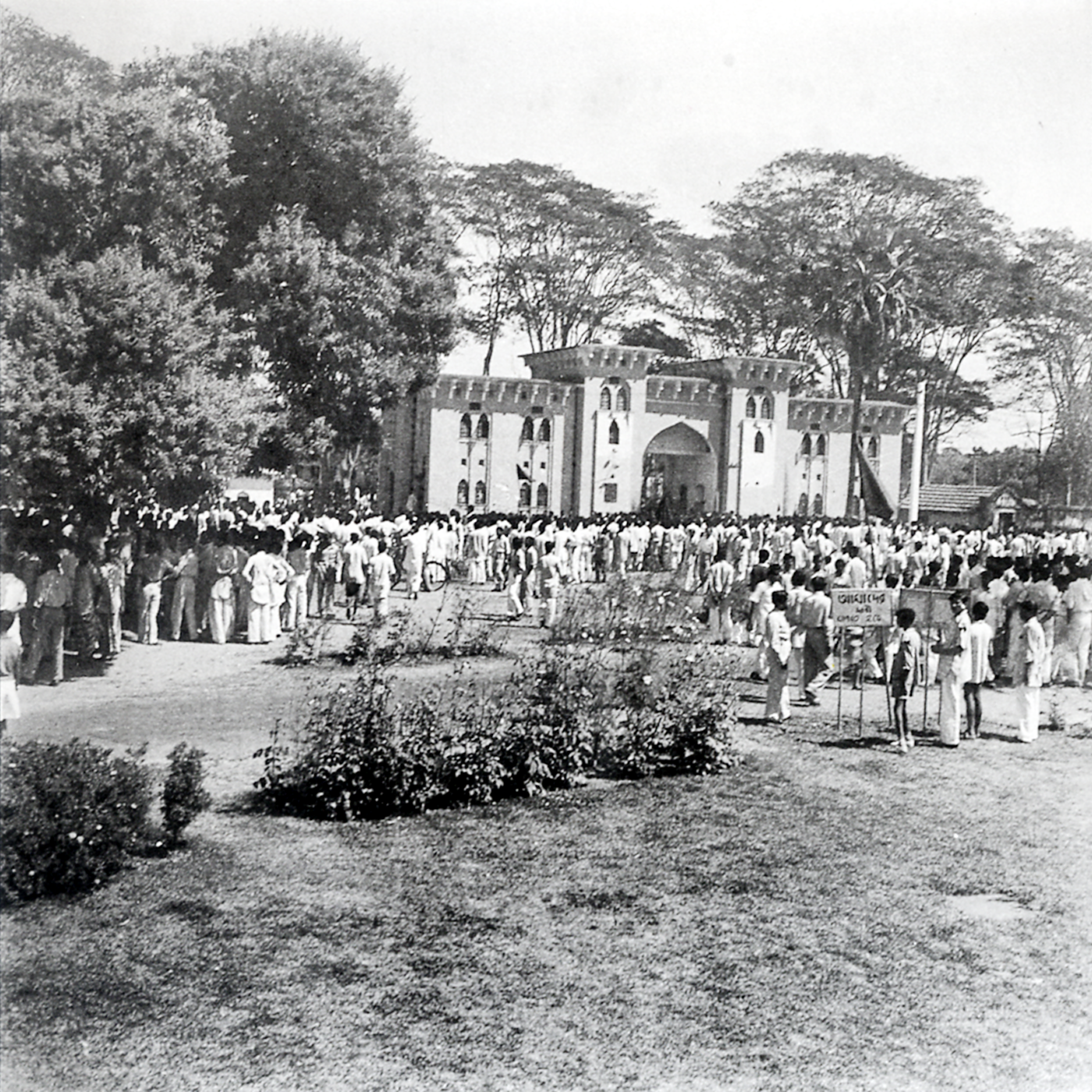
Language Movement Day, 1952

The conservative Muslim League leader Nurul Amin succeeded Nazimuddin as chief minister. According to some sources, Amin had strained relations with the federal government, including Prime Minister Liaquat Ali Khan and Governor General Khawaja Nazimuddin. Historians have noted that Amin's government was not strong enough to administer the provincial state; it was completely under the control of the central government of Nazimuddin. His government did not enjoy enough power and lacked vision, imagination, and initiatives.

In 1949, Maulana Bhashani led left-wing elements in the Muslim League to break away and form the Awami Muslim League. The new party was joined by Huseyn Shaheed Suhrawardy, a former prime minister of British Bengal. The new party later dropped the word Muslim, fashioned itself as secular and courted votes from East Bengal's large non-Muslim minorities.

The language movement reached a climax in 1952. During the unrest, the police shot dead four student activists. This raised more opposition in the region to the Muslim League. Leading politicians in West and East Pakistan called for Amin's resignation. In subsequent provincial elections, Amin lost his seat in the legislative assembly.

=== Huq ministry ===
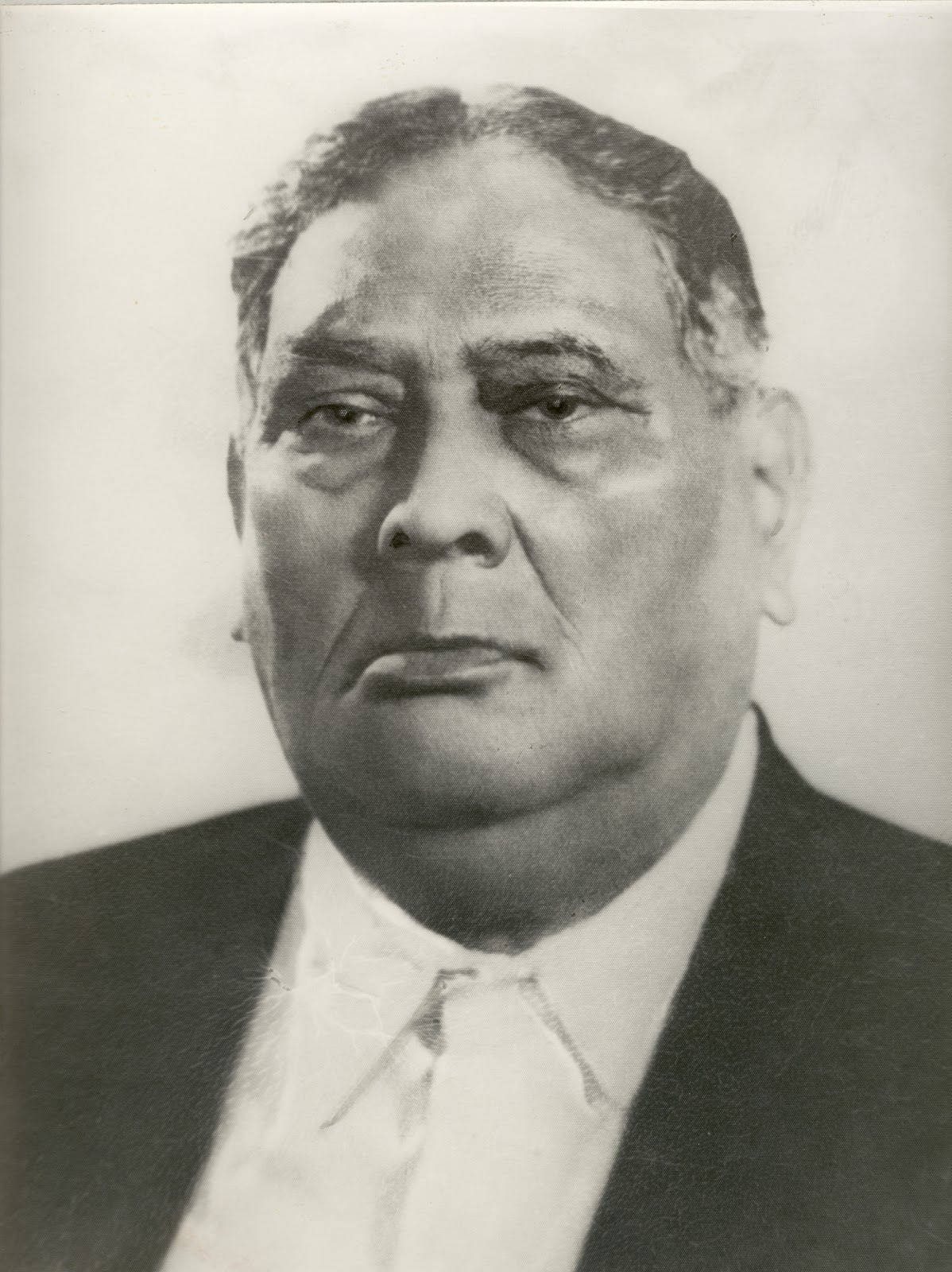
A. K. Fazlul Huq

In the 1954, the United Front coalition resoundingly defeated the Muslim League with a landslide majority. The coalition included the Awami League, the Krishak Praja Party, the Democracy Party and Nizam-e-Islam. The esteemed lawyer A. K. Fazlul Huq, popularly known as the Sher-e-Bangla (Lion of Bengal), became chief minister. Huq established the Bangla Academy and called for greater provincial autonomy. He wanted the federal government's responsibilities limited to only foreign affairs and defence.

King Saud of Saudi Arabia sent a plane to bring Huq to a meeting with the monarch. The New York Times published an article claiming Huq wanted independence for East Bengal. While visiting Calcutta and New Delhi, Huq was received by Indian leaders. Barely a few months into office, Huq was dismissed by Governor General Ghulam Muhammad due to allegations against of Huq of inciting secession.

=== Sarkar ministry ===
After Governor General's rule was withdrawn in 1954, Abu Hussain Sarkar briefly served as chief minister, before Governor General's rule was again imposed. He started the construction of Central Shaheed Minar.

=== Khan ministry ===
Governor General's rule was withdrawn in June 1955. Ataur Rahman Khan of the Krishak Sramik Party was the last chief minister. His government declared 21 February, the anniversary of the language movement, a public holiday. He later resigned on 30 August 1956 over inflation of food grains and subsequent food shortages.

=== The One Unit Scheme ===
As part of the reform and reorganization policies of Prime Minister of Pakistan Mohammad Ali of Bogra, East Bengal was renamed as East Pakistan by the Constitution of Pakistan adopted on 29 February 1956.

== Administration ==
There were 3 administrative divisions in the province, including the Chittagong Division, Dacca Divisionand Rajshahi Division. There were a total of 17 districts.

Division	Divisional Headquarters	Districts
Chittagong Division	Chittagong	Sylhet, Tippera, Noakhali, Chittagong and the Hill Tracts
Dacca Division	Dacca	Dacca, Mymensingh, Faridpur and Backergunge
Rajshahi Division	Rajshahi	Dinajpur, Jessore, Rangpur, Bogra, Pabna, Khulna, Kushtia

== Federal law and East Bengal ==
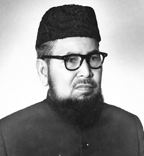
Maulvi Tamizuddin Khan, Speaker of the Constituent Assembly of Pakistan

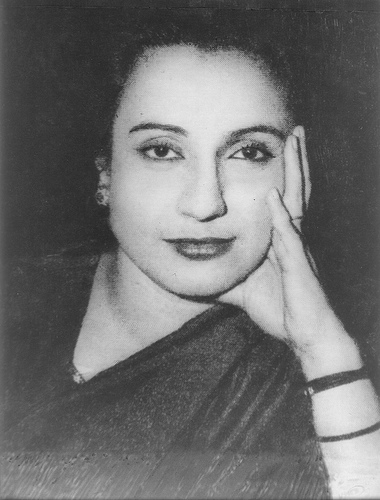
Begum Shaista Suhrawardy Ikramullah, one of the first female lawmakers from East Bengal

East Bengal existed when Pakistan did not have a written constitution. Instead, the Pakistani courts relied on English common law and the Objectives Resolution.

=== Constitutional coup ===
In 1953, Prime Minister Khawaja Nazimuddin's government was dismissed by Governor General Ghulam Muhammad, in spite of enjoying the confidence of a majority in the Constituent Assembly of Pakistan. The governor general later dissolved the constituent assembly itself. In the case of Federation of Pakistan v. Maulvi Tamizuddin Khan, the speaker of the dissolved constituent assembly challenged the governor general's decision in the Sindh High Court. The case proceeded to the apex court- the Federal Court of Pakistan- where Justice M. Munir ruled in favour of the governor general. Justice A. R. Cornelius expressed dissent and supported Speaker Khan. The dismissal of the prime minister and assembly was one of the first major blows to democracy and the rule of law in the Pakistani Union.

=== Reform demands ===
Begum Shaista Suhrawardy Ikramullah called for Pakistan's constituent assembly to convene in Dacca as East Bengal was home to the majority of Pakistan's population.

== Governors and chief ministers ==
Tenure	Governor of East Bengal
15 August 1947 – 31 March 1950	Sir Frederick Chalmers Bourne
31 March 1950 – 31 March 1953	Sir Feroz Khan Noon
31 March 1953 – 29 May 1954	Chaudhry Khaliquzzaman
29 May 1954 – May 1955	Iskandar Ali Mirza
May 1955 – June 1955	Muhammad Shahabuddin (acting)
June 1955 – 29 February 1956	Amiruddin Ahmad
29 February 1956	Province of East Bengal renamed as East Pakistan

Tenure	Chief Minister of East Bengal	Political Party
15 August 1947 – 14 September 1948	Sir Khawaja Nazimuddin	Muslim League
14 September 1948 – 3 April 1954	Nurul Amin	Muslim League
3 April 1954 – 29 May 1954	A. K. Fazlul Huq	United Front
29 May 1954 – August 1955	Governor's Rule	N/A
20 June 1955 – 29 February 1956	Abu Hussain Sarkar	Krishak Sramik Party
29 February 1956	Province of East Bengal renamed as East Pakistan	

== Economy, culture, religion and military ==
=== Industry and culture ===
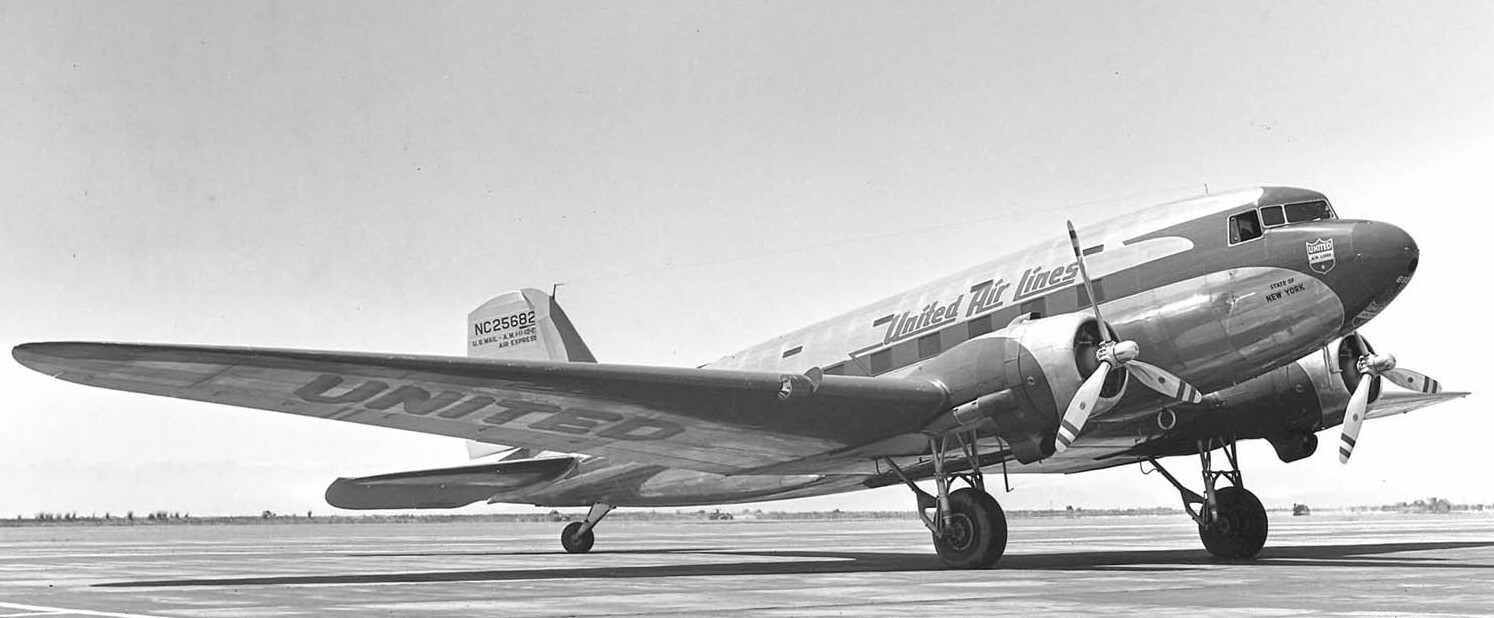
A Douglas DC-3, seen here, belonging to United Air Lines, was also used by Orient Airways for flights between Dacca and Karachi.

Orient Airways, owned by an East Bengal-based industrialist, launched the first flights between Karachi and Dacca. The airline later evolved into Pakistan International Airlines.

The Chittagong Tea Auction was established in 1949.

As a result of the Bengali language movement, East Bengal was a centre of Bengali cultural activities.

The University of Dacca was a hotspot of political thought.

=== Military ===
The East Bengal Regiment was formed on 15 February 1948 following Pakistan's independence and transition from post British rule. The infantry of the new Pakistan Army was made up exclusively of men from the western part of the country. It was consequently necessary to raise a regiment in the East. A total of eight battalions were raised. Paramilitary forces like the East Pakistan Rifles and East Pakistan Ansars were established, Ansars were deployed to the border areas in 1948 during the Indo-Pakistani war of 1947–1948 to prevent crimes and smuggling. In the wake of communism rising and beginning of the Nachole uprising at Rajshahi division, army troops were used to tackle and successfully suppress the movement in 1949-1950. The military conducted anti-smuggling operation called "Operation JUTE" to aid the civil power from 3 September 1952 to 25 December 1952.Personals again started an anti-smuggling operation in 1958 called "Operation Close Door". In 1954, military was deployed during the Adamjee Jute Mills riots to de-escalate the bizarre situation.

=== Religion ===
Religions in East Bengal (1800 AD before partition)
1. Hinduism (56.4%)
2. Islam (41.9%)
3. Others (1.70%)

East Bengal (present-day Bangladesh) had a population of 19 million people in the year 1800 A.D, of which 10.716 million people were followers of Hinduism representing a majority of about 56.4% of the region's population, while 7.961 million adhered to the Muslim faith, constituting 41.9% of the region's population as 2nd largest community. The smaller number of 323,000 people followed Buddhism, Animism and Christianity, together presenting around 1.7% of the region's population.

The spread of Islam in East Bengal was more the result of conversion than conquest; dissatisfied with Buddhism and opposed to Hinduism, which put the majority of the population of East Bengal into the lower caste, vast numbers of Bengalis were attracted by the Islamic doctrine of the equality of all men before God. But they retained many of their old rituals and incorporated them into their new faith.

Bangladesh's capital Dhaka city name is said to have been derived from Dhakeshwari the patron goddess of the city, whose shrine is located in Ramna of Dhaka city. In Bangladesh, there's exist a blending culture of Hindu, Muslim, Buddhist, folk religion, deities and practices. Worship exchanges takes place at temples and mosques and religious folk music gatherings (especially at Vaishnavite gatherings and among Muslim Sufis). Folk deities recognized by both Hindus and Muslim have included Shitala, the goddess of small pox, Oladevi, goddess of cholera, Manasa, goddess of snakes and are recognised by Hindus and Muslims of Bangladesh both alike.

== See also ==
- Provinces of Pakistan
- East Pakistan
- Bangladesh
- Dominion of Pakistan
- West Pakistan
