= Bolsa Mercantil de Colombia =

- Type: Commodities exchange
- Location: Bogotá, Colombia
- Founded: 1979
- Key people: Sergio Villamizar (Chairman); María Inés Agudelo (CEO)
- Currency: Colombian peso
- Market cap: COP 89 830 billion (2025) (USD 24,82 billion)
- Website: www.bolsamercantil.com.co

Bolsa Mercantil de Colombia (BMC) is a Colombian Mercantile Exchange. At first a true commodity exchange market, it has been primarily a source of financing for securitization of agricultural products.

BMC is a mixed capital company governed by private law and subject to supervision by the Superintendencia Financiera de Colombia (Financial Supervision Body of Colombia). It shares are traded on the Colombian Stock Exchange.

It is headquartered in Bogotá, and has 5 regional offices located in Ibagué, Barranquilla, Cali, Medellín and Manizales.
