= List of commodities exchanges =

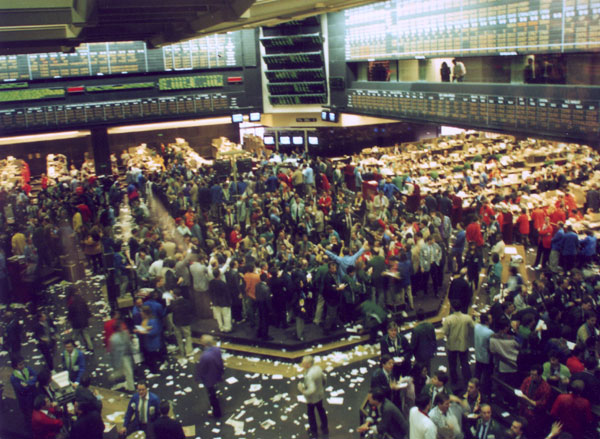
The floor of the Chicago Board of Trade, a major commodities exchange in the United States.

A commodities exchange is an exchange, or market, where various commodities are traded. Most commodity markets around the world trade in agricultural products and other raw materials (like wheat, barley, sugar, maize, cotton, cocoa, coffee, milk products, pork bellies, oil, and metals). Trading includes various types of derivatives contracts based on these commodities, such as forwards, futures and options, as well as spot trades (for immediate delivery).

A futures contract provides that an agreed quantity and quality of the commodity will be delivered at some agreed future date. A farmer raising corn can sell a futures contract on his corn, which will not be harvested for several months, and gets a guarantee of the price he will be paid when he delivers; a breakfast cereal producer buys the contract and gets a guarantee that the price will not go up when it is delivered. This protects the farmer from price drops and the buyer from price rises. Speculators and investors also buy and sell these contracts to try to make a profit; they provide liquidity to the system.

Some of these exchanges also trade financial derivatives, such as interest rate and foreign exchange futures, as well as other instruments such as ocean freight contracts and environmental instruments. In some cases these are mentioned in the lists below.

== Major commodity exchanges ==
See List of futures exchanges#Major derivatives exchanges.

== Commodities exchanges across the world ==
Main commodity exchanges worldwide:

=== Africa ===
Group	Name	Abbreviation	City	Commodity types
	Ghana Commodity Exchange	GCX	Accra, Ghana	Agricultural
	Africa Mercantile Exchange	AfMX	Nairobi, Kenya	Agricultural, Energy
	Egyptian Commodities Exchange	EGYCOMEX	Cairo, Egypt	Agricultural, Energy
	Nairobi Coffee Exchange	NCE	Nairobi, Kenya	Coffee
	Ethiopia Commodity Exchange	ECX	Addis Ababa, Ethiopia	Agricultural
	Mercantile Exchange of Madagascar	MEX	Antananarivo, Madagascar	Agricultural, Metals, Energy
	East Africa Exchange	EAX	Kigali, Rwanda	Agricultural
	Agricultural Commodity Exchange for Africa	ACE	Lilongwe, Malawi	Agricultural
	Auction Holding Commodity Exchange	AHCX	Lilongwe, Malawi	Agricultural
	Bourse Africa (previously GBOT)		Ebene City, Mauritius	Metals, Forex
JSE Limited	South African Futures Exchange	JSE	Sandton, South Africa	Agricultural
	Nigeria Commodity Exchange	NCX	Abuja, Nigeria	Agricultural products
	Lagos Commodities and Futures Exchange	LCFE	Lagos, Nigeria	Agricultural products, Oil and Gas, Currency, Solid Minerals
	AFEX Commodities Exchange Limited	AFEX Nigeria	Abuja, Nigeria	Agricultural products
	Zimbabwe Mercantile Exchange	ZMX	Harare, Zimbabwe	Agricultural commodities
	Tanzania Mercantile Exchange	TMX	Dar es salaam, Tanzania	Agricultural commodities, Solid Minerals

=== Americas ===
Group	Exchange	Abbreviation	Location	Product Types
	Amercanex		Denver, United States	Cannabis
	Brazilian Mercantile and Futures Exchange	BMF	São Paulo, Brazil	Agricultural, Biofuels,
CME Group	Chicago Board of Trade	CBOT	Chicago, United States	Grains, Ethanol, Treasuries, equity index, Metals
CME Group	Chicago Mercantile Exchange	CME	Chicago, United States	Meats, Currencies, Eurodollars, equity index, interest rate future
CME Group	New York Mercantile Exchange	NYMEX	New York, United States	Energy, Precious Metals, Industrial Metals
CME Group	Kansas City Board of Trade	KCBT	Kansas City, United States	Agricultural
	Chicago Climate Exchange	CCX	Chicago, United States	Emissions
	Flett Exchange		Jersey City, United States	Environmental
	HedgeStreet Exchange		California, United States	Energy, industrial Metals
	HoustonStreet Exchange		New Hampshire, United States	Crude Oil, Distillates
ICE	Intercontinental Exchange	ICE	Atlanta, United States	Energy, Emissions, Agricultural, Biofuels
	LedgerX	LX	New York, United States	Digital Assets
	Memphis Cotton Exchange		Memphis, United States	Agricultural
	MATba Rofex	MATba Rofex	Argentina	Financial and Agricultural
Miami International Holdings	Minneapolis Grain Exchange	MGEX	Minneapolis, United States	Agricultural
	Nadex Exchange		Chicago, United States	Energy, Industrial Metals
	Nodal Exchange	Nodal	Virginia, United States	Energy, Power, Environmental
	Sioux City Grain Exchange	SCGX	Sioux City, United States	Agricultural
	U.S. Futures Exchange	USFE	Chicago, United States	Energy
	Winnipeg Commodity Exchange	ICE	Manitoba, Canada	Agricultural

=== Asia ===
Group	Name	Abbreviation	Location	Product Types
	Bombay Stock Exchange	BSE	India	Base metal, agricultural, energy, precious metals
	Manila Commodity Exchange	MCX	Manila, Philippines	Base metals, agricultural, energy, and currencies
	International Commodity Exchange Kazakhstan		Almaty, Kazakhstan	Industrial and Mineral Products, Oil by-products and petrochemicals, Agricultural
	Agricultural Futures Exchange of Thailand	AFET	Bangkok, Thailand	Agricultural
	Bangla Mercantile Exchange			
	Bursa Malaysia	MDEX	Malaysia	Biofuels
	Cambodian Mercantile Exchange	CMEX	Phnom Penh, Cambodia	Energy, Industrial Metals, Rubber, Precious Metals, Agricultural
	Chittagong Tea Auction		Chittagong, Bangladesh	Tea
	Dalian Commodity Exchange	DCE	Dalian, China	Agricultural, Plastics, Energy
	Dubai Mercantile Exchange	DME	Dubai, United Arab Emirates	Energy
	Dubai Gold & Commodities Exchange	DGCX	Dubai, United Arab Emirates	Precious Metals
	Hong Kong Mercantile Exchange	HKMEx	Hong Kong	Gold, Silver
	ICE Futures Abu Dhabi	IFAD	Abu Dhabi, United Arab Emirates	Murban oil futures
	Indonesia Commodity and Derivatives Exchange	ICDX	Jakarta, Indonesia	Agricultural, Base Metals, Financial Products
	Iran Energy Exchange	IRENEX	Tehran, Iran	All energy carriers such as crude oil, petroleum products, electricity, coal
	Iran Mercantile Exchange	IME	Tehran, Iran	Industrial and Mineral Products, Oil by-products and Petrochemicals, Agricultural
	İzmir Commodity Exchange	ICE	İzmir, Turkey	Agricultural
	Jakarta Futures Exchange	JFX	Jakarta, Indonesia	Cocoa, Coffee, Precious Metals, Olein, CPO, Coal, Tea, Rubber
Japan Exchange Group	Osaka Exchange	XOSE	Osaka, Japan	Financials, Precious Metals, Rubber, Agricultural
Japan Exchange Group	Tokyo Commodity Exchange	TOCOM	Tokyo, Japan	Energy
	Osaka Dojima Exchange	XKAC	Osaka, Japan	Agricultural, Raw sugar, Precious metals
	Commodities & Metal Exchange Nepal Ltd.	COMEN	Nepal	Gold, Silver
	National Spot Exchange Limited	[NSEL]	Mumbai, India	
	Nepal Derivative Exchange Limited	[NDEX]	Kathmandu, Nepal	Agricultural, Precious Metals, Base Metals, Energy
	Derivative and Commodity Exchange Nepal Ltd.	DCX	Kathmandu, Nepal	Agricultural, Bullion, Base Metals, Energy
	MEX Nepal	MEX	Kathmandu, Nepal	Agricultural, Bullion, Base Metals, Energy
	Nepal Spot Exchange Limited	NSE	Kathmandu, Nepal	Agricultural, Bullion
	Indian Commodity Exchange Limited	ICEX	India	Energy, Precious Metals, Base Metals, Agricultural www.icexindia.com
	Multi Commodity Exchange	MCX	India	Precious Metals, Base Metals, Energy, Agricultural
	National Commodity and Derivatives Exchange	NCDEX	India	Precious Metals, Base Metals, Energy, Agricultural
	National Multi-Commodity Exchange of India Ltd	NMCE	India	Precious Metals, Base Metals, Agricultural
	Chamber of Commerce, Hapur	COC	India	Agricultural
	Ace Derivatives & Commodity Exchange Ltd.	ACE	India	Agricultural
	Bhatinda Om & Oil Exchange Ltd.	BOOE	India	Agricultural
	Universal Commodity Exchange	UCX	India	Agricultural, Energy, Precious Metals
	Pakistan Mercantile Exchange	PMEX	Pakistan	Precious Metals, Agricultural, Energy, Interest rate futures, currencies, Metals
	Shanghai Futures Exchange	SHFE	Shanghai, China	Industrial metals, Gold, Petrochemicals, Rubber, Base metals
	Shanghai International Energy Exchange	INE	Shanghai, China	Energy, rubber, metal
	Shanghai Gold Exchange		Shanghai, China	Precious Metals
SGX Group	Singapore Commodity Exchange	SICOM	Singapore	Agricultural, Rubber
	Asia Pacific Exchange	APEX	Singapore	Financials, Agricultural, Energy
	ACX (AirCarbon Exchange)	ACX	Singapore	Carbon offset
	Uzbek Commodity Exchange	UZEX	Tashkent, Uzbekistan	Metals, crude oil products, chemicals, base oils, LPG and polyethylene, sugar, agricultural, etc.
	Zhengzhou Commodity Exchange	CZCE	Zhengzhou, China	Agricultural, PTA
	Mercantile Exchange of Vietnam	VNX	Hanoi, Vietnam	Coffee, Rubber, Steel
	Buôn Ma Thuột Coffee Exchange Center	BCEC	Buôn Ma Thuột, Vietnam	Coffee
	Mongolian Commodity Exchange	MCE	Ulaanbaatar, Mongolia	There are 21 types of raw materials of 6 group commodities traded on the market: "Cashmere, Wool, Livestock, Grain, Meat, Leather"

=== Europe ===
Group	Exchange	Abbreviation	Location	Product Types	Life Time
	APX-ENDEX	APX-ENDEX	Amsterdam, Netherlands	Energy	
	Trieste Commodity Exchange	BMTS	Trieste, Italy	Agricultural	
	Commodity Exchange Bratislava, JSC	CEB	Bratislava, Slovakia	Emissions, Agricultural, Diamonds	
	Climex	CLIMEX	Amsterdam, Netherlands	Emissions	
Deutsche Börse	Eurex Exchange	EUREX	Frankfurt, Germany	Agricultural, Metals, ETCs, Commodities Index	
Deutsche Börse	European Energy Exchange	EEX	Leipzig, Germany	Power, Natural Gas, Emissions, Coal	
ICE	European Climate Exchange	ECX	London, United Kingdom	Emissions	founded in 2005, acquired by ICE in 2010 and merged into ICE Futures Europe
ICE	London Commodity Exchange	LCE	London, United Kingdom	Agricultural	Merged into LIFFE in 1996
	Energy Exchange Austria	EXAA	Vienna, Austria	Energy, Emissions	
	Commodities Investment Exchange	COINVEX	London, England	Oil & Gas, Mining, Renewable Energy	
	Integrated Nano-Science & Commodity Exchange	INSCX	United Kingdom	Nanomaterials	
Nasdaq, Inc.	Nasdaq Commodities		Oslo, Norway	Power, Natural Gas, Emissions, Freight, Iron Ore	
Euronext	Nord Pool Spot		Oslo, Norway	Power, Energy	Acquired by Euronext in 2020
Euronext	Euronext		Europe	Agricultural	
Hong Kong Exchanges and Clearing	London Metal Exchange	LME	London, United Kingdom	Industrial Metals, Plastics (Delisted in 2011)	
	Power Exchange Centra Europe	PXE	Prague, Czech Republic	Power	
	Belarusian Universal Commodity Exchange	BUCE	Minsk, Belarus	Metals, Agricultural, Timber, Industrial and consumer goods	
	Saint-Petersburg International Mercantile Exchange	SPIMEX	Moscow, Russia	Crude oil, Petrochemicals, Natural gas, Metals, Agricultural, Timber	
	Moscow Energy Exchange	MOSENEX	Moscow, Russia	Energy	Closed since March 2017
	Iberian Energy Exchange	OMIE-OMIP	Lisbon–Madrid, Portugal–Spain	Power, Energy	
	Bursa Română de Mărfuri	BRM	Bucharest-Romania	Electric power, Natural gas, CO_{2} Emission Allowances, Petroleum products, Construction materials	

=== Oceania ===
Group	Exchange	Abbreviation	Location	Product Types
ASX	Australian Securities Exchange	ASX	Sydney, Australia	Agricultural, Energy, Interest Rate Future
	ABX Global	ABX	Brisbane, Australia	Precious Metals
	CBL Markets	CBL	Sydney, Australia	Energy, Emissions, Environmental

== See also ==
- Commodity market
- Commodity trading in private electronic markets
- List of futures exchanges
- List of traded commodities
