= İzmir Commodity Exchange =

İzmir Commodity Exchange ICE (İTB)
- İzmir Ticaret Borsası
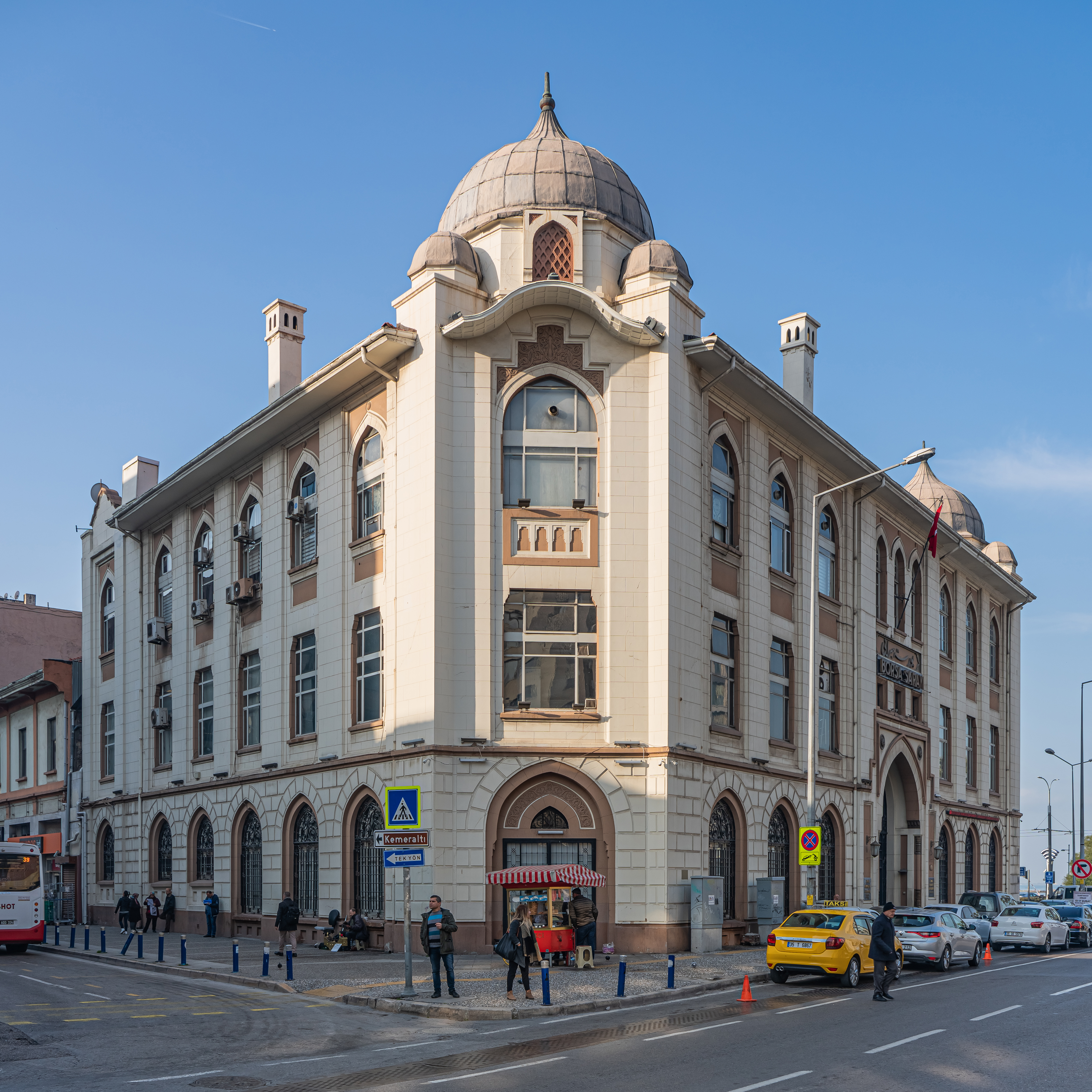
- Type: Commodities exchange
- Location: İzmir, Turkey
- Founded: 1891
- Key people: Işınsu Kestelli (President)
- Currency: Turkish lira (TRY)
- Commodities: Agricultural commodities
- Website: itb.org.tr/en/

İzmir Commodity Exchange (ICE) is a commodities exchange based in İzmir, Turkey. It was the first commodities exchange established in Turkey and focuses on agricultural products. It functions in accordance with the Turkish Law No. 5174 regarding the Union of Chambers and Commodity Exchanges of Turkey and the Chambers and Commodity Exchanges.

== History ==
The İzmir Commodity Exchange was established in İzmir, the 3rd largest province of Turkey, in 1891 as the first commodity exchange of Turkey.

İzmir has always been an important hub for agricultural production and one of the centers for domestic and foreign trade throughout the Ottoman Empire and the Republic of Turkey. In fact, İzmir harbour was the most important export harbour of the Ottoman Empire in the early 20th century, which made the city the host for the first efforts to systemize the agricultural markets and the first commodity exchange of Turkey.

In the second half of the 19th century, the boost in the volume of the trade in İzmir urged the merchants to seek for new methods and regulations in order to catch up with novelties. Although new warehouses had been built to store the goods, unbalanced price adjustments, lack of proper statistics to determine demand and supply, and uncertainty of the money markets used to negatively affect the commercial life of the city. These problems caused the tradesmen and producers to suffer great losses. The tradesmen of İzmir commenced to make several attempts to overcome these problems. The Commercial Assembly and İzmir Chamber of Commerce were established in 1850 and 1885, respectively. The English, French, Italians and the Dutch had their own chambers of commerce in İzmir. However, these attempts had fallen behind in creating solutions to the problems of the market.

Although the first legal arrangements in the Ottoman Empire were carried out in 1886, it is known that some attempts were made before this date to establish a commodity exchange in İzmir. It is also known that the building belonging to a tradesman called Nişli Hacı Ali Efendi was used as “the grain exchange” just before the 1890s. The arguments to establish a modern commodity exchange based on a legal status and conforming to certain rules were brought forward in the early 1890s. In 1891, two different commodity exchanges were attempted to be established by two different tradesmen, however, the General Commodity Exchange regulations specified only one commodity exchange in each city. Therefore, upon the inspections by the Ministry of Public Works, Nişli Hacı Ali Efendi's Commodity Exchange was declared as the sole legal exchange in the city and it was inaugurated with a ceremony on Monday, 13 June 1892.

The first elections were held at the end of that year and the first board of directors was formed. The regulations came into effect on 21 January 1895. The products traded at the Exchange in 1897 were barley, wheat, refined flour, semolina, bran, rye, flour, corn, maize, chickpea, dry beans, black-eyed pea, hemp seed, vetch, aniseed, dent corn, sesame, broad bean, poppy seed, olive oil, cotton, cotton seed and opium poppy. The public was informed daily of the transactions and prices through the local newspapers, which made monitoring supply and demand volume of the market possible.

As the economic life was severely damaged and agricultural production decreased during the World War I and Turkish Independence War, İzmir Commodity Exchange experienced rough times. Following the independence of Turkey and declaration of the republic, the present building of the İzmir Commodity Exchange was built and opened with a ceremony on 11 June 1928.

Since then, İzmir Commodity Exchange has been serving its members and the society in general in the same building, the Exchange Palace, located at Gazi Boulevard No:2, Konak/İzmir.

== Affiliates, subsidiaries and joint ventures of the ICE ==
- Aegean Agricultural Products Licensed Warehouse Inc. (ELIDAS)
- İzmir Commodity Exchange Electronic Platform (ICEEP)
- "E-Commodity Bazaar" Electronic Commodity Trading Portal
- Turkish Derivatives Exchange (TURKDEX)
