= Lashihai Wetland =

Nature reserve in Yunnan, China

- Lashi Lake
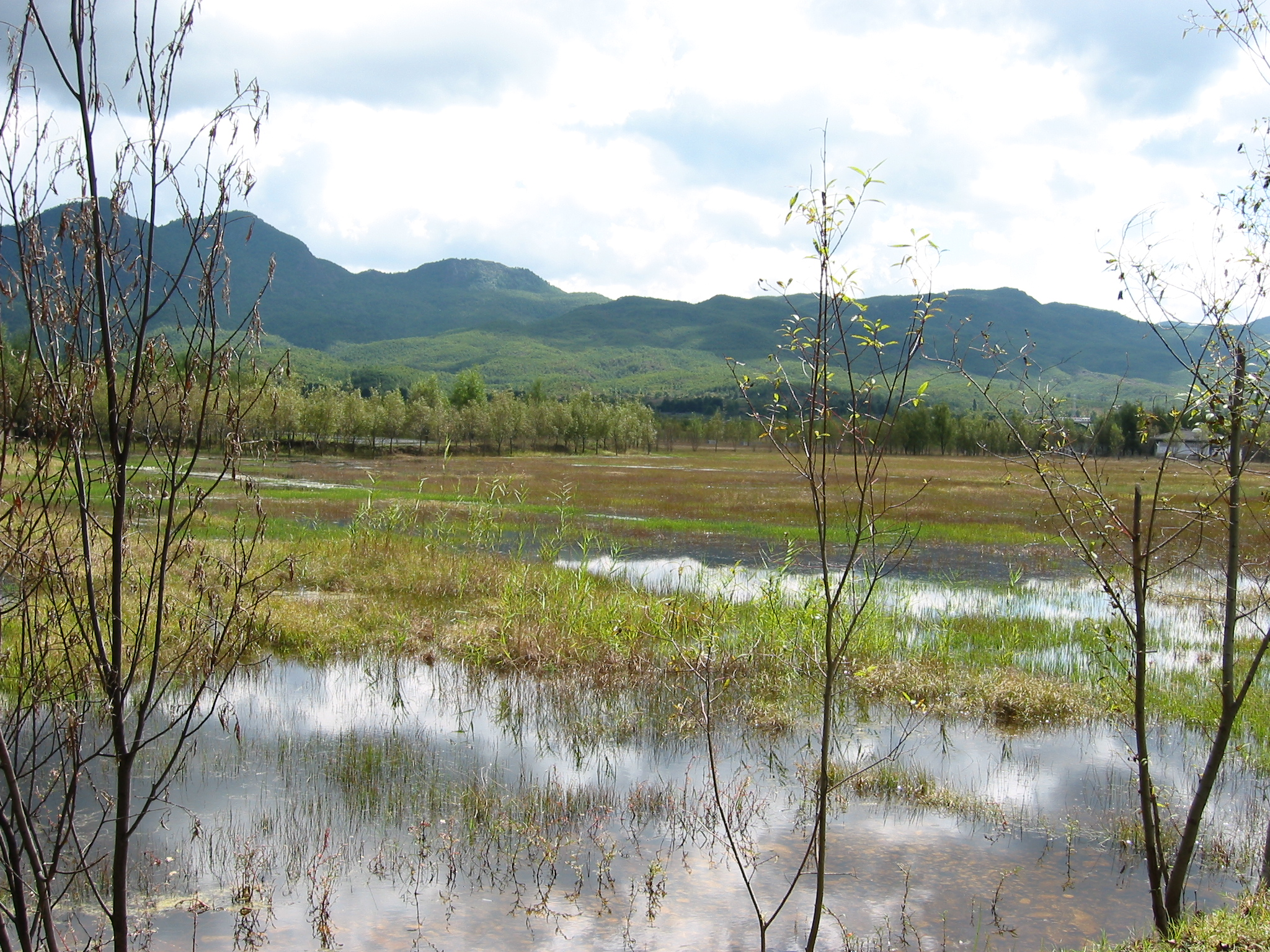

- Location within Yunnan
- Location: Yunnan Province, China
- Coordinates: 26°53′N 100°08′E
- Area: 3,560 ha (13.7 sq mi)
- Designation: Provincial Nature Reserve
- Designated: 2004 Ramsar wetland

Ramsar Wetland
- Official name: Lashihai Wetland
- Designated: 12 July 2004
- Reference no.: 1437

Lashihai Wetland is a system of freshwater lakes and wetlands in Yunnan Province of south-central China. It is located in the Hengduan Mountains between 2,440 and 3,100 meters elevation. It includes Lashihai lake and its surrounding wetlands, as well as Wenhai lake to the north and Jizi Reservoir to the south. The wetlands drain into the Jinsha River, an upper basin tributary of the Yangtze.

The lakes and wetlands provide drinking water to the city of Lijiang, and provide flood control, water storage, and water balance to the middle and lower basin of the Yangtze, which is home to hundreds of millions of people.

The wetlands are important habitat for resident and migratory waterbirds. More than 100,000 waterbirds visit each year, and use the lake as a migratory stop-over, breeding ground, and/or wintering habitat. 76 species of geese and ducks have been observed here, and it is habitat for the critically endangered white-shouldered ibis (Pseudibis davisoni) and Baer's pochard (Aythya baeri).

The lake was designated a Ramsar site (wetland of international importance) in 2004, and is also designated a provincial nature reserve. The protected area covers 35.6 km^{2}. Fishing, poaching and hunting have been banned to protect the lake's wildlife. It attracts 5000 visitors daily, particularly for birdwatching. A pilot payment for ecosystem services (PES) project in and around the reserve involved cooperation from Conservation International China, including work on scheme design and implementation arrangements for watershed-related services and conservation objectives.
