= Belarusian Universal Commodity Exchange =

Belarusian Universal Commodity Exchange (BUCE)
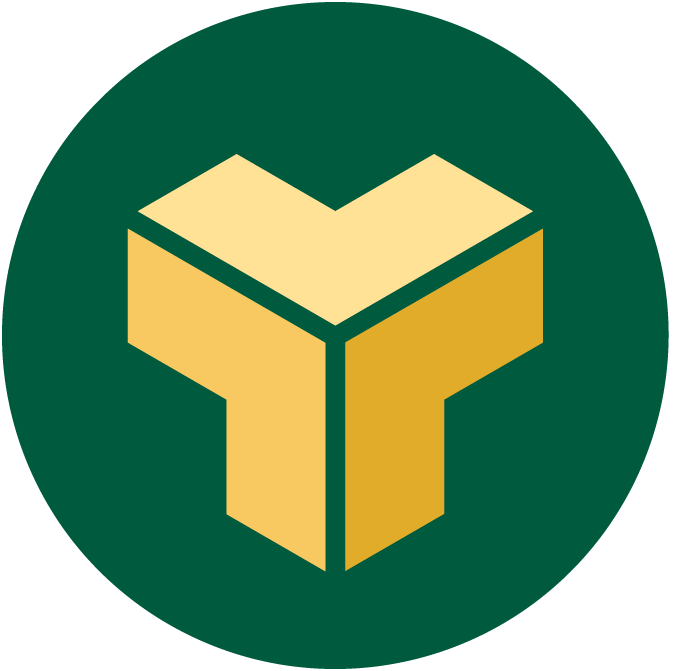
- Native name: Белорусская универсальная товарная биржа (БУТБ)
- Company type: Commodities exchange
- Founded: 2004
- Headquarters: Minsk, Belarus
- Website: www.butb.by

Belarusian Universal Commodity Exchange (BUCE) (full name: Open Joint-Stock Company Belarusian Universal Commodity Exchange) is the only commodity exchange in the Republic of Belarus and one of the largest in Eastern Europe. The BUCE is an open joint-stock company with the controlling stake (98%) owned by the government.

Founded in 2004, BUCE now has 29,000 registered members from 70 countries, including 6000 foreign companies. BUCE head office is located in Minsk with branches in all five of the country's regional centers: Brest, Gomel, Grodno, Mogilev and Vitebsk. The BUCE also has exchange brokers in China, Estonia, Germany, Israel, Latvia, Lithuania, Russia, and Poland.

== History ==
Belarusian Universal Commodity Exchange was incorporated on May 25, 2004. BUCE was created under the initiative of the country’s president, Alexander Lukashenko, by Council of Ministers Resolution No. 1719 of 30 December 2003.

The first trading session, to sell timber, took place on June 2, 2005; the trade in metal products began on June 29, 2005. In Q4 2005 the commodity exchange started preparing to sell agricultural products, and launched agricultural sales in January 2006. In May 2009, an online trading platform for industrial and consumer goods was launched.

In December 2010, BUCE was authorized to hold electronic auctions under government procurement contracts. In November 2012, BUCE started trading derivatives.

== Structure and product range ==
BUCE comprises five commodity sections:

- Metals and articles thereof;
- Timber and articles thereof;
- Agricultural products;
- Industrial and consumer goods;
- Promising commodities

These sections conduct trading sessions to sell a wide range of commodity items. The major ones are ferrous and non-ferrous metals and articles made thereof, scrap metal and metal byproducts, coal, coke, cables and wires (metal products section), standing timber, round timber, timber, plywood and flake boards, paper and pasteboard (timber products section), hard cheese, milk powder, casein, butter, rapeseed oil, sunflower and soy oil cakes, rawhides (agricultural products section), industrial machinery, electronics, etc. (industrial and consumer products section). Every day the BUCE hosts five to seven trading sessions.

== International relations ==
BUCE is a member of several international organizations. In 2008 it joined the International Association of Exchanges of the CIS (IAE CIS), and in 2011 it acceded to the Association of Futures Markets (AFM). The BUCE also maintains partner relations with Saint-Petersburg International Mercantile Exchange, ETS Commodity Exchange, Uzbek Commodity Exchange, Kyrgyz Stock Exchange, the Russian Union of Metal and Steel Suppliers, etc.
