= Manila Commodity Exchange =

Commodity and derivatives exchange located in Ayala Avenue

- Type: Private Limited
- Industry: Financial Services
- Headquarters: First Trade Center, Ayala Avenue, 1202 Makati, Philippines
- Products: Futures and options contracts on precious metals, base metals, energy, agriculture commodities, currencies

Manila Commodity Exchange/Makati Commodity Exchange (MCX) was a commodity and derivatives exchange located in Ayala Avenue, Makati, Philippines. MCX had 84 registered members throughout the Philippines. MCX provided a platform for trading of commodities, futures contracts and options contracts on various base metals, agriculture commodities, energy, and currencies. The monthly volume on all contracts was around US$12.6 million. Defunct 20 years ago.
