= Conservation International China =

Country programme of Conservation International in China

- Abbreviation: CI China
- Formation: 2002
- Type: Country programme
- Headquarters: Beijing, China
- Region served: China
- Parent organization: Conservation International
- Website: Official website

Conservation International China (CI China) is the China country programme of Conservation International. Established in 2002, the programme works on biodiversity conservation and sustainable-development initiatives in China, with early projects focused on the mountainous biodiversity regions of Southwest China and later expansion into freshwater and wetland conservation.

Programme work has included conservation programmes in southwest China, pilot work on payments for ecosystem services (PES) around the Lashihai Nature Reserve near Lijiang in Yunnan, and freshwater-basin initiatives applying the Freshwater Health Index (FHI) approach in areas including the Poyang Lake basin and the Dongjiang River basin.

== Overview ==
CI China is headquartered in Beijing and has worked through a network of offices and field teams in several Chinese cities. By 2006, the programme operated through offices in Beijing, Chengdu and Kunming. As of 2021, Conservation International maintained a representative office in Beijing and field project teams in Chengdu, Nanchang and Guangzhou.

In the mid-2000s, programme activity focused on mountain landscapes of southwest China, including parts of Yunnan, Sichuan, the Tibetan Plateau and adjacent areas of Qinghai and Gansu. Projects described for this period included work around flagship species such as the giant panda and golden snub-nosed monkey. Activities included biodiversity surveys, development of conservation monitoring systems, training for local and government staff, and community-based conservation and development initiatives, including forest restoration with native species and standards for eco-friendly tourism, alongside engagement with businesses and work addressing wildlife trade and consumption.

In Yunnan, the programme cooperated on PES pilot work in and around the Lashihai Nature Reserve near Lijiang. The pilot examined compensation and incentive mechanisms linked to agriculture and tourism in the Lashihai watershed, including compensation for crop losses associated with protected migratory birds and incentives intended to encourage agricultural practices aimed at improving water quality for landscape services and the traditional water system of the old town of Lijiang. The pilot used special fees on visitors to the old town of Lijiang and Lashihai Nature Reserve, with the fees used to compensate upstream farmers for land-use changes affecting watershed services.

From 2009, CI China expanded into additional areas including freshwater conservation and wetland work. The FHI is an indicator framework for assessing freshwater systems as integrated social–ecological systems by combining ecological and hydrological indicators with measures of ecosystem services and governance and stakeholder information; the framework has been applied in the Dongjiang River basin in southern China. In the Poyang Lake basin, work launched in 2019 has applied the FHI approach in wetland ecosystem protection and sustainable resource-use initiatives. In the Dongjiang River basin, Conservation International and the IUCN led a consortium that coordinated an FHI assessment. The Dongjiang supplies water to cities along the river in Guangdong and is an important water source for Hong Kong.

== History ==
Conservation International began its China programme in 2002.

From 2002 to 2009, programme work focused on mountainous biodiversity regions of southwest China. By 2006, the programme operated through offices in Beijing, Chengdu and Kunming.

Work associated with the programme included cooperation on a PES pilot around the Lashihai Nature Reserve near Lijiang.

From 2009, CI China expanded into additional areas including freshwater conservation and wetland work. An FHI assessment of the Dongjiang River basin was published in 2017, and work applying the FHI in the Poyang Lake basin was launched in 2019.

== Programmes and operations ==
Locations mentioned in the article (1 Beijing, 2 Chengdu, 3 Kunming, 4 Guangzhou, 5 Nanchang (Poyang Lake basin), 6 Lijiang (Lashihai Nature Reserve), 7 Heyuan (Dongjiang River basin))

=== Southwest China biodiversity programmes ===
From 2002 to 2009, programme work focused on mountain biodiversity regions of southwest China, including areas from the southeastern Tibetan Plateau through western Sichuan and into northwestern Yunnan, as well as adjacent parts of Qinghai and Gansu. Projects in this period included work around flagship species such as the giant panda and golden snub-nosed monkey.

Activities included launching a biodiversity monitoring system and partner network, and providing technical training and policy support to nature reserves. Work also included community-based conservation and development initiatives (including approaches based on Tibetan sacred natural site management practices), forest restoration using native species, and development of eco-friendly tourism standards.

Programme activities also included engagement with businesses and efforts addressing wildlife trade and consumption, including public awareness initiatives and support to law enforcement agencies. Research linked to the programme in the region has included a peer-reviewed study of wildlife trade, consumption and conservation awareness based on fieldwork in southwest China.

=== Ecosystem services approaches ===
In Yunnan, CI China cooperated on pilot work applying PES at and around the Lashihai Nature Reserve near Lijiang.

=== Freshwater and wetland programmes ===
In the Poyang Lake basin in Jiangxi, CI China launched work in 2019 applying the FHI approach to identify challenges and prioritise actions for wetland ecosystem protection and sustainable resource use. A stakeholder workshop on applying the FHI in the basin was held in Nanchang on 22–23 August 2020. Poyang Lake, China's largest freshwater lake, is a focal landscape for the basin-scale work around the Poyang Lake system and the provincial capital, Nanchang.

In the Dongjiang River basin in Guangdong, an application of the FHI framework assessed freshwater ecosystem status and management priorities using a combination of ecological, hydrological and social indicators and stakeholder preferences. Conservation International and the IUCN led a consortium that coordinated an FHI assessment of the basin and published a technical report in 2017, including discussion of pressures and change in upstream areas such as Heyuan. The Dongjiang is one of the three tributaries of the Pearl River and supplies fresh water for a total of more than 40 million people in cities along the river in Guangdong and in Hong Kong. About 70–80% of Hong Kong's fresh water supply is imported from the Dongjiang to make up the shortfall of local yields.

Selected landscapes associated with Conservation International China programme themes
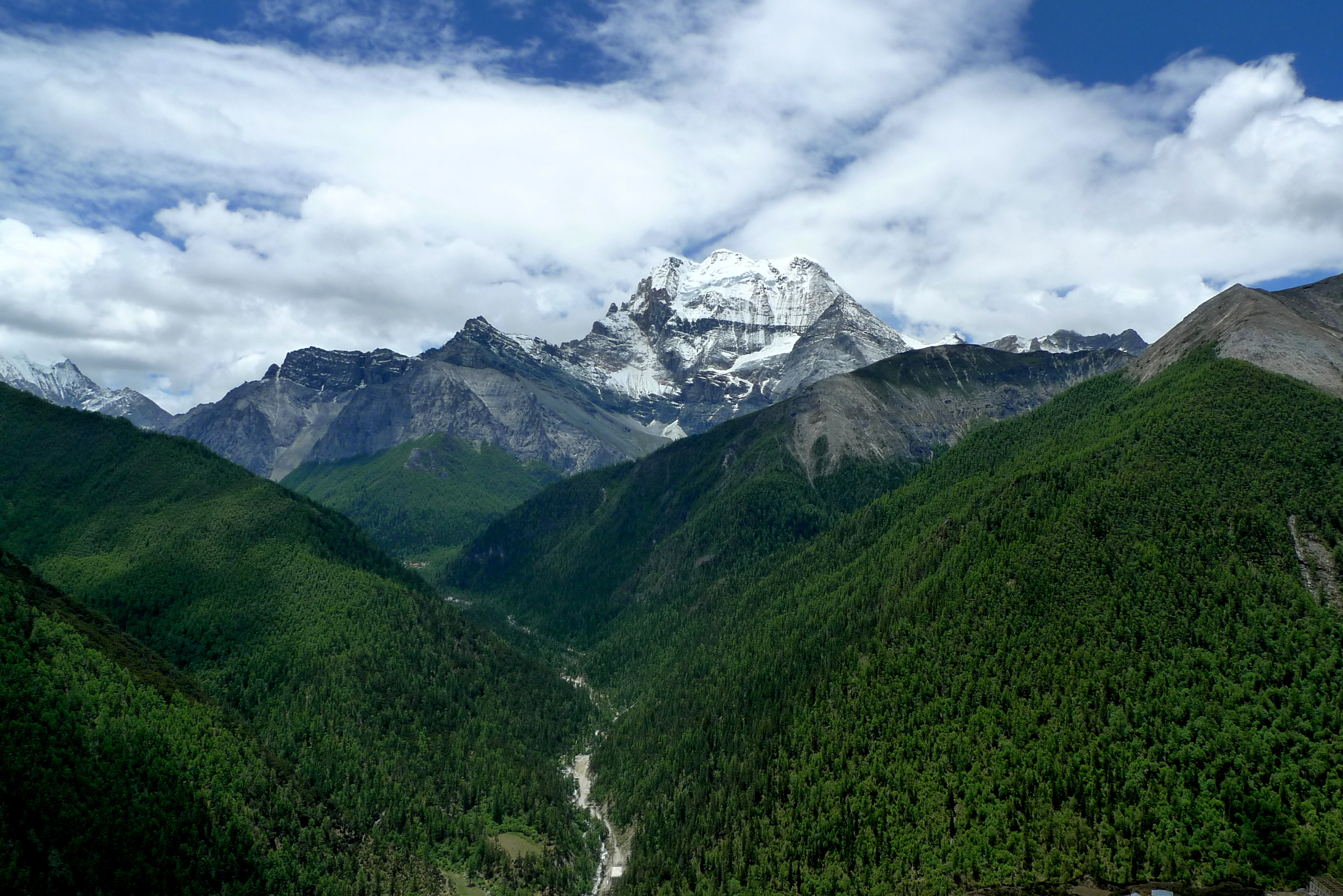
Mountain landscape in Yading, western Sichuan, within the broader southwest China mountain region

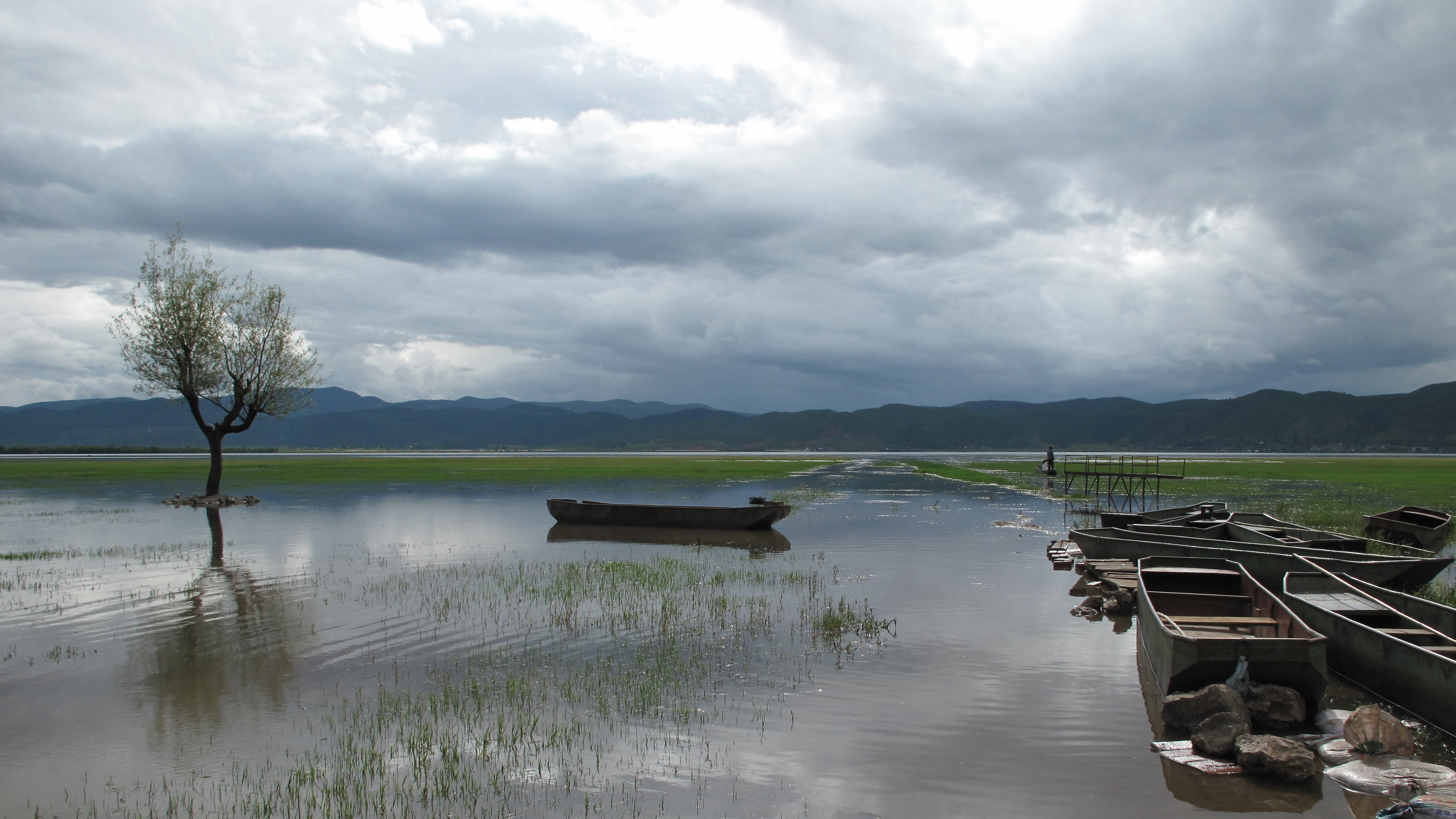
Lashi Lake near Lijiang, Yunnan

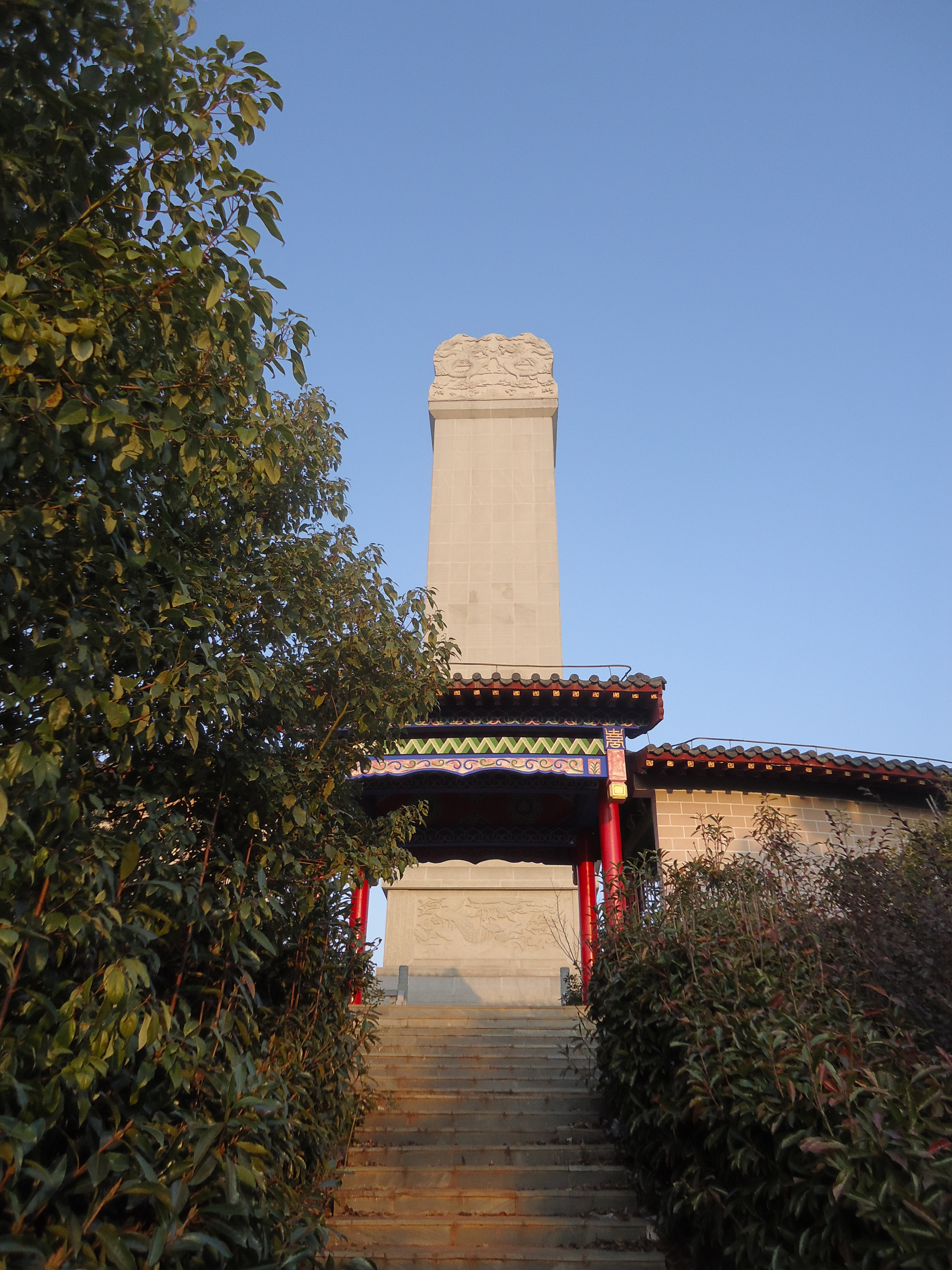
National Poyang Wetland Park, Jiangxi

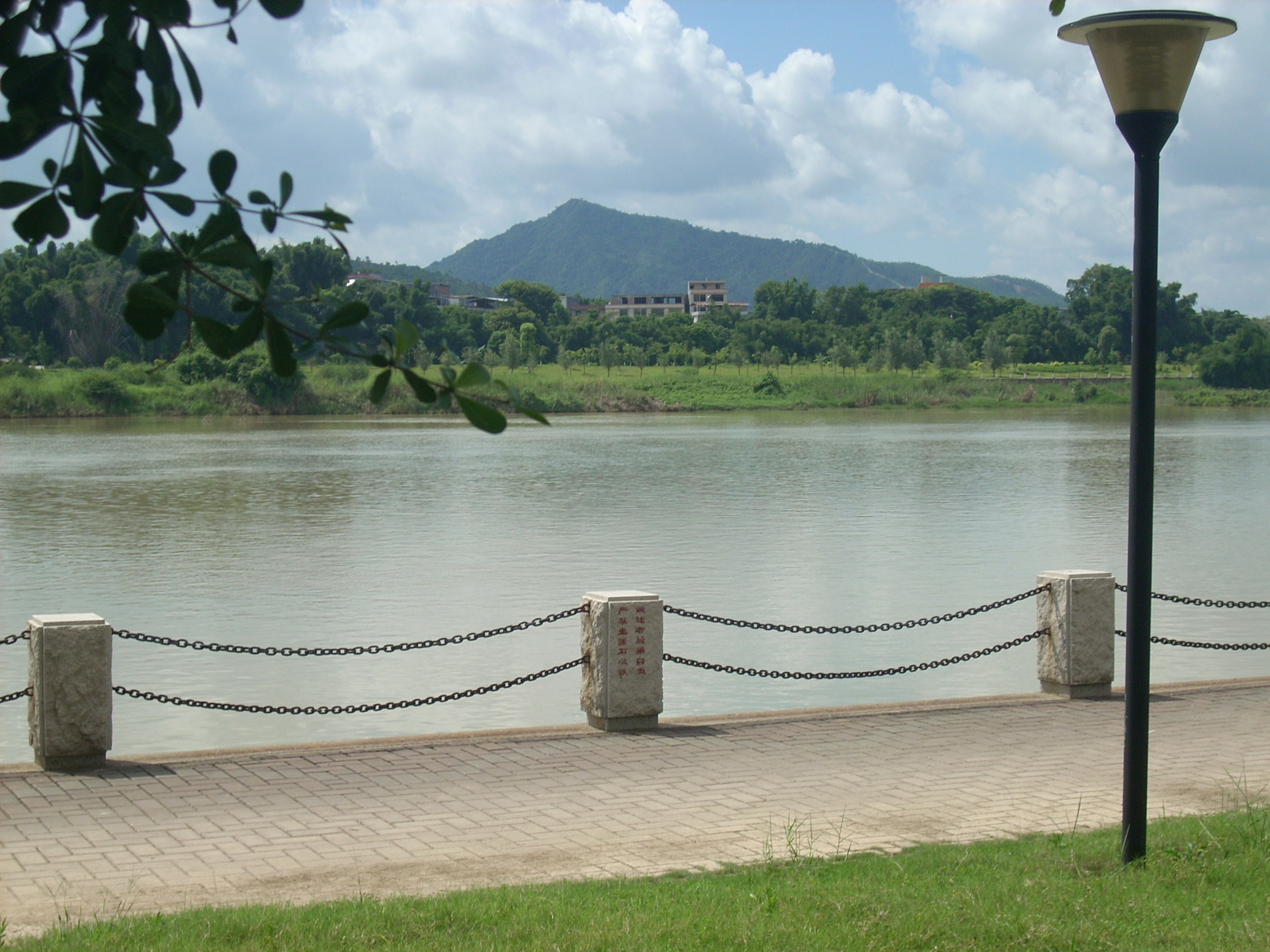
The Dongjiang River near Heyuan, Guangdong

== Partnerships ==
Programme activities have involved cooperation and information sharing between government agencies, NGOs and communities, along with engagement with businesses and support for nature reserve and law enforcement capacity in conservation work.

In the Lashihai watershed near Lijiang, a PES pilot study was carried out by Fondazione Eni Enrico Mattei (FEEM) in cooperation with CI China and involved local government bodies and management authorities in Lijiang and Yulong County responsible for old-town management, tourism, construction, agriculture, forestry, environmental protection and hydrology, alongside the wetland nature reserve management bureau and village-level committees.

In the Dongjiang River basin, an FHI assessment was coordinated by a consortium led by Conservation International and the IUCN, with technical contributions from Sun Yat-sen University, South China University of Technology, the Pearl River Water Resources Commission and the Pearl River Hydraulic Research Institute.

In the Poyang Lake basin, CI China has partnered with Sateri on wetland conservation and restoration initiatives in collaboration with the Jiangxi Provincial Forestry Bureau; a later phase of the partnership was launched with support from the Jiujiang Municipal Government.

In Yunnan, the Yunnan Green Environment Development Foundation was described as jointly founded by the Yunnan provincial forestry department, the Shanshui Center for Nature and Society (Conservation International) and The Nature Conservancy.

== Funding and conservation finance ==
Programme activities have included conservation grant-making and conservation-finance approaches alongside field programmes.

In the mid-2000s, programme activities included administering conservation funding through the Critical Ecosystem Partnership Fund (CEPF) for the Mountains of Southwest China biodiversity hotspot (2002–2007). CEPF is a joint initiative involving Conservation International, the Global Environment Facility, the Government of Japan, the John D. and Catherine T. MacArthur Foundation and the World Bank, and provides grants to nongovernmental and other private organisations working in biodiversity hotspots.

=== Payments for ecosystem services and eco-compensation ===
In China, "eco-compensation" has been used as an umbrella term covering market-based payments for ecological services and fiscal-transfer arrangements supporting environmental management across administrative boundaries, including watershed services.

In the Lashihai watershed near Lijiang, CI China cooperated on pilot work applying PES at and around the Lashihai Nature Reserve. The pilot examined compensation for crop losses associated with protected migratory birds and incentives intended to encourage agricultural practices aimed at improving water quality for downstream services, including the traditional water system of the old town of Lijiang. A later summary described the pilot as using special fees on visitors to the old town of Lijiang and Lashihai Nature Reserve, with the fees used to compensate upstream farmers for land-use changes affecting watershed services. Discussions of PES in China have linked such schemes to broader "eco-compensation" and other market-based environmental policy approaches.

=== Basin initiatives and external support ===
An FHI assessment of the Dongjiang River basin listed philanthropic support from the Victor and William Fung Foundation Limited, the Borrego Foundation, the Flora Family Foundation, the Betty and Gordon Moore Foundation and the Starwood Foundation.

In the Poyang Lake basin, wetland conservation and restoration initiatives have been developed with corporate and government partners, including a partnership with Sateri and the Jiangxi Provincial Forestry Bureau; a third phase of the Poyang Lake Ecosystem Restoration Initiative was launched in 2024.

== Impact and evaluation ==
Published materials related to CI China's work in China include pilot studies and basin assessments that report findings, identify information gaps and propose management actions.

=== Lashihai payments for ecosystem services pilot ===
The Lashihai PES pilot examined incentive and compensation mechanisms linked to agriculture and tourism in the Lashihai watershed, including compensation for crop losses associated with protected migratory birds and payments intended to encourage farming practices aimed at improving water quality for downstream services in the old town of Lijiang. Recommendations discussed for the pilot included making compensation conditional on changes in agricultural practices, and applying a "beneficiary pays" approach in which downstream beneficiaries (including tourists) help finance payments and reserve management through mechanisms such as tourism-related fees and differentiated entrance fees. The pilot also discussed institutional and monitoring arrangements intended to link payments to verified changes and to improve management of the wetland nature reserve and watershed services.

=== Dongjiang basin Freshwater Health Index assessment ===
The 2017 Dongjiang basin FHI assessment produced component scores for freshwater ecosystem condition and management, including an Ecosystem Vitality score of 60, an Ecosystem Services score of 82 and a Governance and Stakeholders score of 56. The assessment used a stakeholder survey to weight ecosystem-service priorities and identified information gaps for some services indicators (including cultural services), with suggestions for additional data collection and refinement of indicators. It also recommended further development of water-quality monitoring and more localised governance and stakeholder assessment to support basin management and future reassessments.
