= Amercanex =

American cannabis financial service company

Amercanex International Exchange
- Amercanex logo
- Industry: Commodities exchange
- Founded: 2014
- Fate: Acquired by Helix TCS
- Headquarters: Denver, Colorado
- Key people: Steve Janjic, CEO
- Website: amercanex.com

Amercanex was a Denver, Colorado-based company founded in 2014 that created an electronic commodities exchange for cannabis. The company bought and sold cannabis futures, depending on standardization of grades and even nomenclature around strains. The platform, ACExchange, built with the Dodd-Frank Act in mind, included transparent pricing, reporting, RFID plant tracking and back office functionalities that enabled compliance with Securities Exchange Commission regulations. The CEO, Steve Janjic, was formerly involved in the foreign exchange market working at TP ICAP. Richard Schaeffer, former chairman at NYMEX served as Chairman of Amercanex, was joined by Thomas Ross as board member, former head of trading at BP North America.

By 2016, the company was trading between 100 and 150 pounds of marijuana per week. Efforts to expand further were hampered by the cannabis remaining federally illegal in the United States, which prevented trade across state lines. The company unsuccessfully bid to operate Puerto Rico's seed-to-sale medical cannabis tracking system in 2016.

In February 2019, the company was acquired by Helix TCS, joining that company's portfolio of cannabis exchange platforms which includes Cannabase and BioTrackTHC.
