= CEB VER =

CEB VER is a quality standard for the voluntary carbon offset industry created by Commodity Exchange Bratislava. Based on the Kyoto Protocol's Clean Development Mechanism, CEB VER establishes criteria for validating, measuring, and monitoring carbon offset projects with the option to trade carbon credits and use them for surrendering for individuals, organizations or companies that want to be carbon neutral.

== Methodologies ==
Methodology expresses the exact calculation of how many carbon credits can be issued for project developers. These carbon credits can be traded at Carbon Place. The first methodology issued under the CEB VER standard was CEB VER Solar.
