= Voluntary Emission Reduction =

Voluntary Emission Reductions or Verified Emission Reductions (VERs) are a type of carbon offset exchanged in the voluntary or over-the-counter market for carbon credits. Verified Emission Reductions are usually certified through a voluntary certification process.

Verified Emission Reductions are usually created by projects which have been verified outside of the Kyoto Protocol. One VER is equivalent to 1 tonne of CO_{2} emissions. Through these schemes, industries and individuals voluntarily compensate for their emissions or provide an additional contribution to mitigating climate change.

VERs may be developed and calculated in compliance with one of several VER standards. These set out rules defining how emission reductions are measured. Standards provide assurance for buyers of VERs. At a minimum, all VERs should be verified by an independent third party.

== See also ==
- CEB VER
- Verified Carbon Standard
- CDM Gold Standard
- Certified Emission Reduction
