= Universal Commodity Exchange =

- Type: Commodities exchange
- Location: Mumbai, India
- Founded: 2012
- Owner: Commex Technology Ltd (40%); National Bank for Agriculture and Rural Development (16%); REC (16%); IFFCO (15%); IDBI Bank (10%)
- Key people: Ketan Sheth
- Currency: Indian rupee (₹)
- Website: ucxindia.com

Universal Commodity Exchange (UCX) was India's sixth national level commodity exchange. It went live in 2012 but was shut down by the regulator in 2014.

It was promoted by IT Professional Ketan Sheth from Commex technology Ltd (40%) and institutions such as IDBI Bank (10%), IFFCO (15%), National Bank for Agriculture and Rural Development (16%), Rural Electrification Corporation (16%) are shareholders in the bourse.

It received Ministry approval and Government certification on 30 August 2012. UCX started its operations on 19 April 2013 with 11 contracts in 9 commodities under the leadership of Praveen Pillai as UCX Managing director and CEO.
