= Buče =

Buče Буче
- Town
- Location within Montenegro
- Coordinates: 42°49′11″N 19°51′10″E
- Country: Montenegro
- Municipality: Berane
- Elevation: 2,238 ft (682 m)

Population (2023)
  - Total: 800
- Time zone: UTC+1 (CET)
  - Summer (DST): UTC+2 (CEST)
- Area code: +382 51
- Vehicle registration: BA

Buče (Montenegrin: Buče / Буче) is a small town in the municipality of Berane, Montenegro. According to the 2011 census, its population was 800.

== Demographics ==
Historical population
Year	Pop.	±%
1948	792	—
1953	807	+1.9%
1961	894	+10.8%
1971	956	+6.9%
1981	989	+3.5%
1991	954	−3.5%
2003	1,000	+4.8%
2011	932	−6.8%
2023	800	−14.2%

Ethnicity in 2011

Ethnicity	Number	Percentage
Serbs	517	55.5%
Montenegrins	362	38.8%
other/undeclared	53	5.7%
Total	932	100%
