= Mercantile Exchange of Vietnam =

- Abbreviation: MXV
- Legal representative: Mr. Dang Viet Hung – Chief Executive Offficer of MXV
- Head office: Level 16, Hoa Binh Office Tower, No. 106 Hoang Quoc Viet Street, Nghia Do Ward, Hanoi, Vietnam
- Representative office: M Floor, Empire Tower, No. 26-28 Ham Nghi Street, Sai Gon Ward, Ho Chi Minh City
- Telephone: (+84) 24 3396 3939 - (+84) 28 3535 6363
- Website: https://mxv.com.vn/

Mercantile Exchange of Vietnam (MXV) is the first organizer of a national-scale centralized commodity trading market in Vietnam, operating under the direct surveillance and management of the Ministry of Industry and Trade.

MXV was established on 1 September 2010 under License No. 4596/GP-BCT and was officially interconnected with international exchanges under Decree No. 51/2018/ND-CP dated 9 April 2018.

MXV complies with the laws of Vietnam as well as the rules of the international exchanges with which it is interconnected, and performs a comprehensive range of market functions, including trading, clearing, settlement and delivery; provision of market information; membership management; and trading of commodity contracts in line with international standards.

== History ==
2000 - 2006:

Vietnam began piloting several forward trading models and setting up specialized trading centers for certain commodities such as cashew nuts, seafood and coffee. However, these models did not prove effective because the legal framework was not yet complete.

2006 - 2016:

On 28 December 2006, the Government issued Decree No. 158/2006/ND-CP[2] detailing the Law on Commerce with regard to the establishment of commodity exchanges and the purchase and sale of goods through commodity exchanges.

On 1 September 2010, the Mercantile Exchange of Vietnam was established and began operating, but it could not yet fulfill its role because it was not interconnected with international markets.

2016 - 2018:

Decree No. 51/2018/ND-CP[3] dated 9 April 2018, amending and supplementing Decree No. 158/2006/ND-CP, was issued, creating the legal basis for connecting the Mercantile Exchange of Vietnam with international commodity exchanges.

On 17 August 2018, MXV officially launched its interconnected trading activities with international commodity markets.

2018 - present:

After being permitted to trade on an interconnected basis with international markets, MXV expanded its list of traded commodities, focusing on four main groups: Agriculture, Industrial Raw Materials, Energy and Metals. To date, MXV lists 44 commodities for trading.

== Market operating model ==
MXV organizes the market through a system of market members, comprising Trading Members and Brokerage Members. Members of MXV directly support investors within the scope of their functions and responsibilities, as set out in the prevailing laws of Vietnam, the regulations of MXV and the rules of the interconnected international exchanges, so that the market operates optimally.

MXV currently manages 34 market members (33 Trading Members and 1 Brokerage Member), with a network of offices and branches across provinces and cities nationwide, bringing the commodity market closer to businesses and investors.

== Interconnected Exchanges ==
To date, MXV has established interconnection with 7 major commodity exchanges worldwide,[5] affirming its position on the international map of centralized commodity trading markets. These include:

- Chicago Mercantile Exchange - CME Group (including the CBOT, CME, COMEX and NYMEX exchanges)
- Intercontinental Exchange - ICE (including ICE US, ICE EU and ICE Singapore)
- London Metal Exchange - LME
- Osaka Exchange - OSE
- Singapore Exchange - SGX
- Bursa Malaysia Derivatives Berhad - BMD
- ACM Exchange

Notably, MXV has co-organized a number of prominent international-scale conferences with its interconnected exchanges. Highlights include a series of events with CME Group providing updates on the macroeconomic landscape, such as “Global Perspectives and Outlook for Vietnam's Commodity Trading Market 2023” and “World Economic Outlook and Its Impact on Commodity Markets 2024”. In addition, MXV has actively promoted in-depth, commodity-specific topics through webinars co-hosted with the Intercontinental Exchange (ICE) on coffee trading and with the London Metal Exchange (LME) on investment in and price hedging for copper.

== Contract types ==
MXV offers a full range of contracts, including: futures contracts in a variety of sizes, from standard (Full Size) contracts to smaller contracts (Mini/Micro/Nano) depending on the commodity; options contracts; spread contracts; and structured products that combine futures and options trading.

With this diversity of contract types and sizes, investors can choose products that suit their objectives and capital management capacity.

== Communications activities ==
MXV regards market information as a “special commodity” that plays an important role in raising awareness and supporting commodity trading, a field that is still relatively new in Vietnam. Therefore, in addition to organizing and operating the market, MXV focuses on providing official, timely and accessible information on commodity market developments. Information is shared through television broadcasters, major press agencies and MXV's digital platforms, helping bring commodity information closer to the public and giving businesses and investors a stronger basis for understanding and approaching the commodity market in a structured way.

== Training activities ==
MXV regularly organizes periodic professional training courses to broaden knowledge among Trading Members, Brokerage Members and investors. The professionalization of the market is gaining strong momentum, as the community's demand for commodity trading knowledge and skills continues to grow.

In the first eight months of 2026, the number of brokers from members across the market who took part in professional training programs organized by MXV increased more than 16-fold compared with the same period of the previous year. The target by the end of 2026 is to raise the proportion of professionally certified staff at Trading Members across the system to nearly 100%, equivalent to thousands of brokers trained and with standardized knowledge.

In addition, MXV places emphasis on building future human resources by cooperating with domestic universities and academies to organize conferences, academic seminars and training programs on commodity trading, as well as career orientation programs. These activities have received positive feedback from students, researchers, lecturers and university leaders at institutions such as Foreign Trade University, Academy of Finance, Banking Academy of Vietnam, Academy of Policy and Development, and others.

== Industry association memberships ==
MXV is a member of 7 major domestic industry associations, including: the Vietnam Pepper and Spice Association; Vietnam Petroleum Association; Vietnam Coffee - Cocoa Association; Vietnam Steel Association; Vietnam Cashew Association; Vietnam Association of Small and Medium Enterprises; and Vietnam Rubber Association.
