= Saint-Petersburg International Mercantile Exchange =

Russian commodity exchange

SPIMEX
- Петербургская биржа

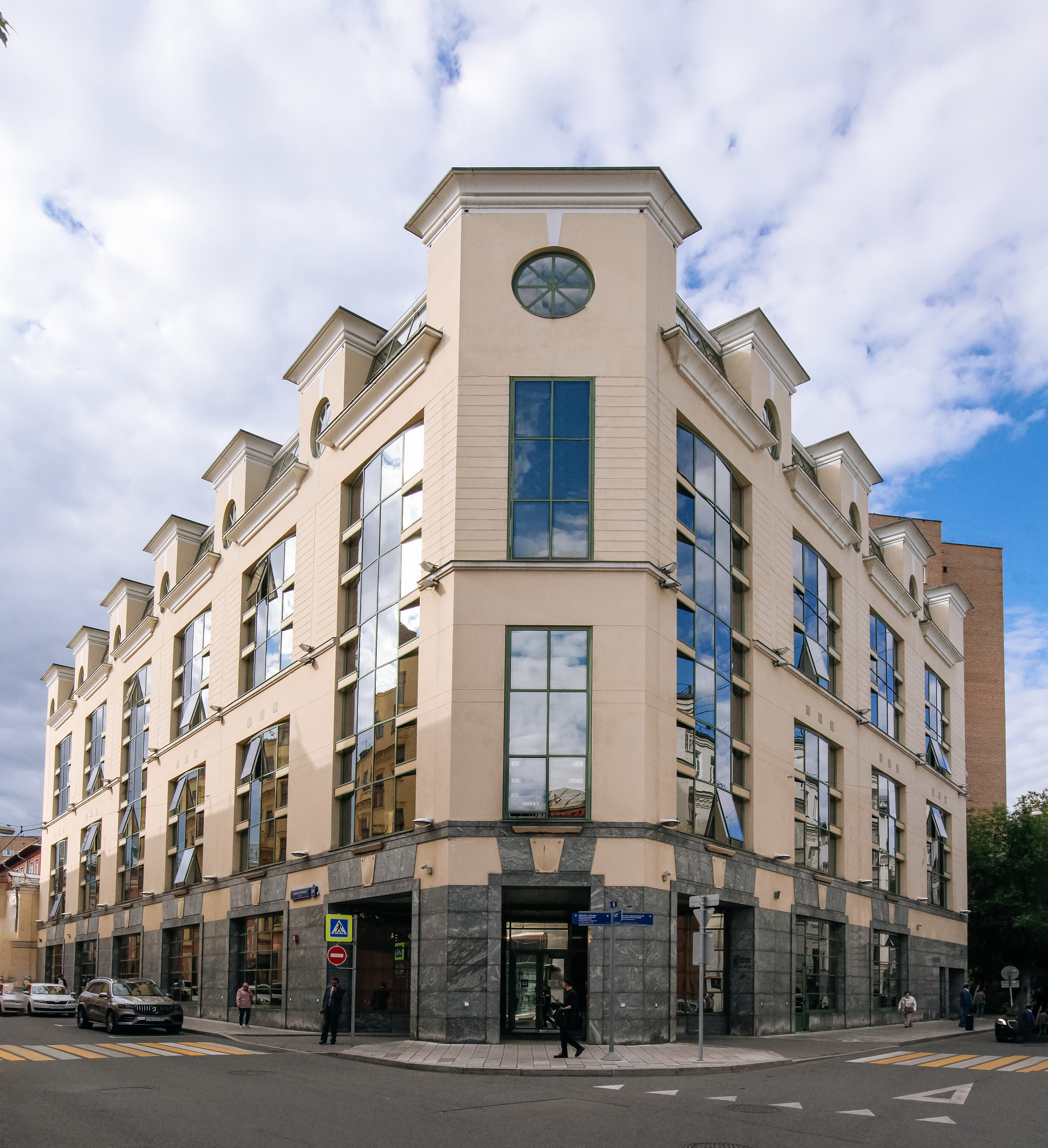
- Rinco Plaza Building, SPIMEX headquarters
- Type: Commodities exchange
- Location: Moscow, Russia
- Founded: May 7, 2008; 18 years ago
- Owner: Russian private investors
- Key people: Igor Artemyev (CEO)
- Currency: Russian Rouble
- Commodities: Oil; Petroleum products Lumber; Natural gas LPG; Mineral fertilizer Building materials
- Website: spimex.com/en/

The Saint-Petersburg International Mercantile Exchange (SPIMEX) is a Russian commodity exchange incorporated in 2008. It has offices in Moscow, Saint Petersburg and Irkutsk.

== General ==
SPIMEX offers a wide range of products in exchange-traded refined products, crude oil, natural gas, coal, timber and construction materials as well as commodity derivatives. Its Refined Products Section focuses on spot contracts for all types of domestically traded refined products delivered from a great variety of designated locations executed under the uniform rules. The SPIMEX Derivatives Section focuses on cash-settled futures on the SPIMEX indices for exchange-traded refined products, physically settled futures on refined products and physically settled SPIMEX Urals Crude Futures.

The clearing organization associated with SPIMEX is Nonbank financial institution – central counterparty «RDC» (previously – SDCO).

SPIMEX calculates price indices for domestic exchange-traded and OTC-traded refined products.

In 2022, the volume traded at the SPIMEX Refined Products Section (gasoline, diesel, jet fuel, fuel oil and petrochemicals) was equal to 29.13 million tonnes; at the SPIMEX Derivatives Section – RUB 13.9 bn and at the SPIMEX Natural Gas Section – 5.7 bcm.

The total turnover of all trading sections of the Exchange in 2021 increased by 39.5% year-on-year (yoy) to RUB 1.494 trillion, in 2022 it slightly decreased to RUB 1.467 trillion. The volume traded in the SPIMEX Refined Products Section in 2022 amounted to 29.127 million tonnes (MMT) rising by 7.8% YoY, while the turnover stood at RUB 1.404 trillion ($17.78 bln) enjoying a 3.1% rise YoY.

In March 2022, the Association of European Energy Exchanges (Europex) excluded SPIMEX from its membership due to Russia's invasion of Ukraine.

Until 2022, the requirements of the Russian government for oil companies to sell part of their products through SPIMEX were in effect. According to these requirements, 11% of gasoline production, 7.5% of diesel fuel, 11% of jet fuel, 3% of residual fuel oil production and 7.5% of LPG were subject to sale through the exchange.

On February 27, the shareholders’ meeting decided to change the abbreviated name of the exchange: instead of JSC SPIMEX, the exchange will be called JSC Petersburg Exchange.

== Commodities traded ==
SPIMEX has been trading:

- refined products — since 2008
- refined products futures — since 2010
- crude oil — since 2013
- natural gas — since 2014
- timber — since 2014
- crude oil futures – since 2016
- mineral fertilizer – since 2017
- coal – since 2019

== Fast facts ==
1. Since 2011, SPIMEX has been registering OTC transactions in crude oil, refined products, coal, natural gas and LPG.
2. SPIMEX calculates price indices for domestic exchange-traded and OTC-traded refined products.
3. Since 2012, the SPIMEX Indices have been used as the underlying assets for futures traded at its Derivatives Section.
4. In 2016, the SPIMEX Urals Crude Futures contract was launched.
5. SPIMEX launched ULSD Futures on 11 November 2019.

== Refined products market ==
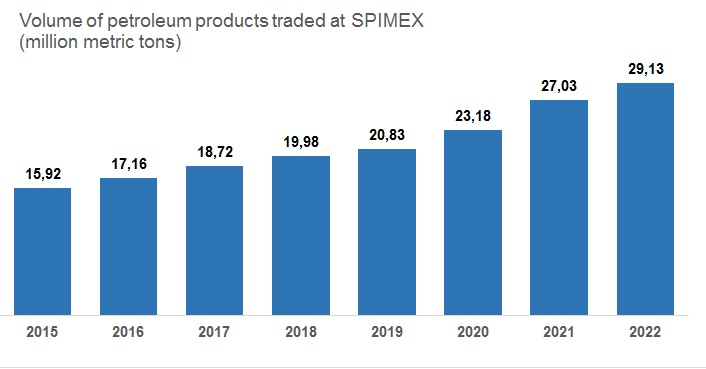
Volume of petroleum products traded at SPIMEX

SPIMEX — the primary trading venue for exchange-traded refined products in Russia.

In 2016, the volume of refined products and petrochemicals traded on SPIMEX amounted to 17.16 million tonnes. The number of trading participants exceeded 1,900 including all Russian majors; the list of SPIMEX designated delivery points include all key domestic refineries; the list of commodities accepted to trading includes all types of domestic refined products.

By 2021, the trade in petroleum products has grown to 27.03 million tons (+ 16.6% compared to 2020), by 2022 to 29.13 million tons (+ 7.8% compared to 2021).

== Indices ==
Territorial indices

The average price for refined products at large Russian refineries located in European Russia, the Urals & Western Siberia and Eastern Siberia & the Russian Far East.

Regional indices

The average price for refined products at 9 large domestic demand centers.

Composite index

A unified indicator of Russian domestic refined products which measures price performance of an average tonne of exchange-traded light refined products.

National indices

The average price for refined products at large refineries located all over Russia.

== Crude oil market ==
SPIMEX launched trading in crude oil in 2013. In 2022, the volume traded at the SPIMEX Crude Oil Section stood at 519,400 tonnes (+ 164,4% y-o-y) with the turnover amounting to RUB 16.974 bn.

== Derivatives market ==
SPIMEX offers a variety of futures contracts (at present there are more than 20 instruments available). The volume traded at the SPIMEX Derivatives Section in 2022 reached 69,326 futures contracts in the total amount of RUB 13.9 bn.

More than 10 products are currently offered by the SPIMEX Derivatives Section, including, in particular:

1. physically settled SPIMEX Urals Crude Oil Futures (FOB, Primorsk);
2. physically settled SPIMEX ULSD Futures (FOB, Primorsk);
3. cash-settled futures on the SPIMEX indices for exchange-traded domestic market petroleum products, and
4. physically settled futures on domestic market petroleum products.

Underlying commodities: crude oil; diesel; Gasoline Regular 92; Gasoline Premium 95 and the SPIMEX indices for exchange-traded petroleum products.
Physical delivery is a distinctive feature of SPIMEX commodity-based futures.

Risk Management System (RMS)

Performance of the obligations under futures contracts is guaranteed by the Clearing House.

== Natural gas market ==
On 24 October 2014, SPIMEX launched trading in natural gas.

SPIMEX designated balancing points (located around compressor stations) are as follows: Nadym, Lokosovo and Parabel. Trading Participants include largest domestic natural gas producers and end-users (utilities, fertilizer and metallurgy companies).

In October 2015 SPIMEX launched a day-ahead contracts trades and in October 2016 - trades for delivery on national holidays and weekends.

In 2016, the volume traded at the SPIMEX Natural Gas Section amounted to 16.812 bcm (+119.8% y-o-y), in 2021 – 6.691 bcm (-58.3% y-o-y) and in 2022 – 5.700 bcm (-14.8% y-o-y).

Active development of the market continues. The first stage of commercial balancing of natural gas traded on the Exchange has been implemented. Buyers are now able to sell on the Exchange volumes of natural gas that were purchased earlier, but were not drawn by the end of the day.

== Timber market ==
On 11 July 2014, SPIMEX launched trading in timber. Deliveries of conifer timber traded on SPIMEX originate in the Irkutsk Region of Russia. The Exchange brings together over 60 entities, including major logging companies, forest leaseholders and timber processing businesses. SPIMEX plans to add new trading instruments, to expand geographic reach and in the long run to launch a cross-border delivery mechanism.

In 2022, the volume traded at the SPIMEX Timber & Construction Materials Section amounted to 4,012 million cubic meters. The number of trades made stood at 2,617.

== Registration of OTC transactions ==
SPIMEX is authorized to register OTC transactions in the following exchange-traded commodities:

- refined products;
- crude oil;
- natural gas;
- LPG;
- coal,
- mineral fertilizer and
- timber.

Data on such OTC transactions is used for calculation of the relevant SPIMEX indices.
In 2022, volumes set in the relevant OTC contacts and the number of registered OTC transactions were broken down by product as follows:

- refined products: 343 MMT;
- LPG – 11 MMT;
- crude oil: 501.1 MMT;
- natural gas: 5.3 tcm;
- coal: 775.6 MMT;
- timber: 78.1 mcm;
- mineral fertilizers: 29.5 MMT.

In 2022, the number of companies which registered their OTC transactions with SPIMEX grew up to 1141.

== Market data ==
- SPIMEX distributes market data to regulators, market participants, news agencies, information vendors, research and consulting firms.
- In June 2013, SPIMEX entered into a cooperation agreement with the Federal Antimonopoly Service of Russia (FAS) on enhancing transparency in the domestic crude oil and refined products markets;
- In June 2016, SPIMEX entered into a cooperation agreement with the Ministry of Economic Development of Russia on enhancing transparency in the domestic natural gas, crude oil and refined products markets;
- Market data distributed by SPIMEX is based on actual transaction data (both exchange- traded and registered with SPIMEX by OTC market participants).
