= Flett Exchange =

- Industry: Financial
- Headquarters: Jersey City, New Jersey, United States

Flett Exchange is an environmental commodity exchange and brokerage firm based in Hoboken, New Jersey. The company is specialized in trading of Solar Renewable Energy Certificates (SRECs) in the United States.

== History ==
Michael Flett, who has been a member of the New York Mercantile Exchange since 1996, began his career as an energy broker. He was subject to a disciplinary action concerned an allegation that in October, 2004 and November, 2004 he traded ahead of customer Market on Close orders. He submitted a Joint Offer of Settlement without admitting or denying the allegations against him. The Offer, consisting of a fine of $25,000, restitution in the amount of $74,700, and an order to cease and desist from future similar rule violations, was accepted by the Exchange’s Board of Directors at its meeting held on September 19, 2007. He founded his own company, Flett Futures, Inc., as a broker on the exchange and transitioned it into a proprietary trading firm in 2000. In 2006, Flett founded Flett Exchange to provide price discovery, and liquidity to environmental markets.

== Solar Renewable Energy Certificates ==
=== Exchange ===
Flett Exchange operates an all-electronic exchange to allow participants to buy and sell SRECs online as 24/7 service. The exchange trades SRECs in the states which are in the area of PJM Interconnection which include New Jersey, Maryland, Ohio, Washington, DC, Delaware and Pennsylvania. Flett Exchange is one of the three major auction and exchange platforms in PJM area beside SREC Marketplace and SRECTrade. As of November 2010, a report to the Prince George’s County Solar Water Heating Task Force indicated that Flett Exchange is the only exchange-based marketplace for Maryland SRECs. However, the value had still been limited due to low transaction levels.

=== Spot Market ===
Flett Exchanges' most active market for the sale of SRECs is the Spot Market. Flett Exchange customers utilize its online exchange in which its solar owners log on and sell their SRECs in a transparent and competitive manner. Sales are immediate. Sellers lock in prices and transfer SRECs from their GATs account to the Flett Exchange, LLC GATS account. The Exchange software provides the seller with a contract immediately and the seller is paid via check or electronic bank transfer the same day. Over 7,000 solar owners utilize the Flett Exchange Spot Market to sell their SRECs on a monthly basis.

=== Auctions ===
In the SREC market, there are a couple of methods to conduct SREC auctions.

One method is for electric utility companies which are the buyers of SRECs to conduct auctions and solicit sellers. An example is the "SREC Based Financing Program" which requires some utility companies in New Jersey to conduct quarterly SREC auctions from new solar projects.

Another method is to conduct auctions once a month on specific dates to allow sellers and buyers to get together to transact.

Flett Exchange provides an auction for its public entity clients. The company facilitates the sales directly by conducting public auctions based on the date scheduled in each contract for each seller. This is a format used by government agencies, municipalities, townships, universities, and school districts to sell their SRECs.

=== Long-term contracts ===
The company also acts as a broker to bring counterparties together to negotiate long-term SREC contracts.

=== Price transparency ===
In 2009, National Renewable Energy Laboratory reviewed the status of green power marketing in the United States. A concern on price transparency was discussed in the report. Flett Exchange is one of the participants that publicly disclose pricing data to provide market transparency. The company posts results from its Renewable Energy Certificate auctions on its web site and monthly newsletter. It also posts price and volume information on its voluntary transactions. The publicly disclosed prices voluntarily by the participants have allowed analysis into the status of the markets. Flett Exchange provides daily SREC settlement prices to the public on its website for New Jersey, Pennsylvania, Maryland, Washington DC and Ohio SRECs.

== Other markets ==
Flett Exchange launched physical markets to bring price transparency to seafood, precious metals and New York City Taxi Medallions but had its most success in environmental commodities.

In 2007, Flett Exchange filed an application with the U.S Commodity Futures Trading Commission to become an Exempt Commercial Markets with a plan to trade in energy products and uranium. It maintained the status of Exempt Commercial Markets between 2007 and 2009 but did not continue after 2009.

In 2008, the company launched a platform to get into the Regional Greenhouse Gas Initiative cap and trade market. However, RGGI trading activities on Flett Exchange had lasted only less than two years. The last trading was in January 2010.
