= Chittagong Tea Auction =

Tea sales in Bangladesh

Chittagong Tea Auction center was established on 16 July 1949. Teas manufactured throughout Bangladesh are sold in bulk to buyers through an open auction which is conducted once a week. During each tea season, 45 auctions are held at this auction center.

Bangladesh's tea industry is regulated under the supervision of the Bangladesh Tea Board. Bangladesh Tea Board's governance also extends over the following associations: Tea Traders Association of Bangladesh (TTAB) and Bangladesh Tea Association (BCS).

Tea Traders Association of Bangladesh (TTAB) is responsible for organizing and controlling the Chittagong Tea Auction to ensure swift and transparent sale of tea. The tea auction takes place every Tuesdays and the sale is conducted by Tea Brokers. Under TTAB there are seven authorized tea brokers which are as follows: National Brokers, Purba Bangla Brokers, Unity Brokers, Produce Brokers, K.S. Brokers, Progressive Brokers and Planters Brokers. Among these seven tea brokers, National Broker and Purba Bangla Brokers are the oldest.

"First of all, the tea produced in the gardens is sent to a total of 14 bonded warehouses which are mostly located in Chittagong. Later, the tea brokers receive samples and taste the tea. Tea tasting is the process in which a trained taster determines the quality of a particular tea. Then, the tea brokers prepare catalogs and fix the tentative price of tea. Later, the catalogs and valuation copies are dispatched to all the buyers ahead of the weekly auctions. Then, the traders take part in the auctions and purchase tea. Finally, the tea reaches the retailers and consumers."

""

After each sale a market report and auction statistics are made available to everyone involved.

== See also ==
- Tea processing
- List of stock exchanges in the Commonwealth of Nations
- Purba Bangla Brokers Limited
- Tea Traders Association of Bangladesh
