= Commodity Exchange Bratislava =

European commodities exchange

Commodity Exchange Bratislava, JSC
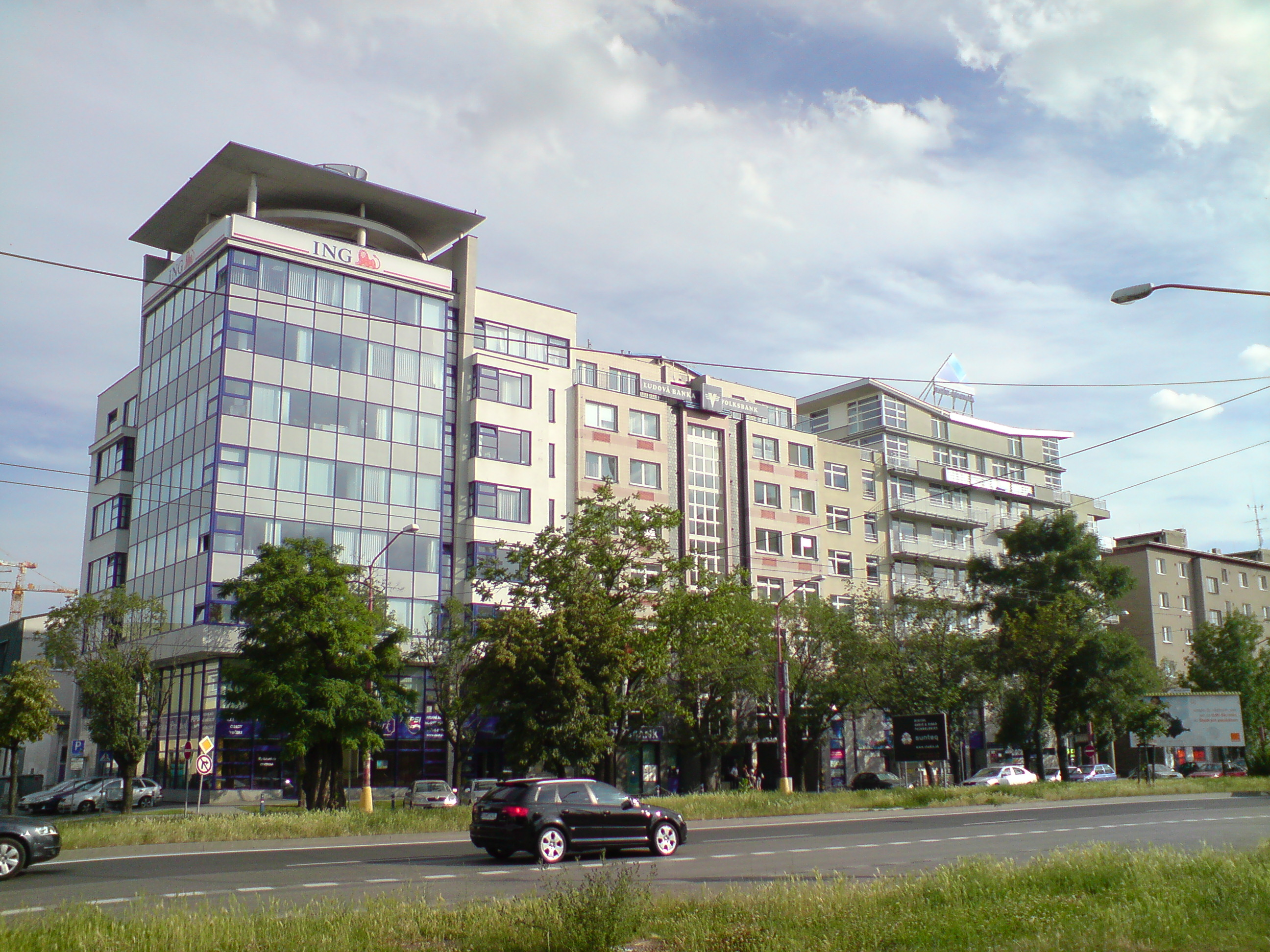
- Type: Joint stock company
- Location: Bratislava, Slovakia
- Founded: December 8, 1992; 33 years ago
- Key people: Ľudovít Scholtz (President of the Exchange Chamber)
- Commodities: Emissions, agricultural and diamonds
- Website: www.kbb.sk

Commodity Exchange Bratislava (CEB) (Slovak: Komoditná burza Bratislava, a.s. (KBB) is a Slovak commodities exchange that is the only commodity market for trading commodities in Slovakia. The exchange is based in Bratislava.

Primary markets on the exchange are emissions trading, agricultural trading and diamond trading. CEB was the first exchange that has started non-stop online trading and clearing.

== History ==
Commodity Exchange Bratislava was formerly known as BMKB, then BCE until it was renamed as CEB. It was established in accordance of the Ministry of Economy of the Slovak Republic in 1992.

== Web services ==
Commodity Exchange Bratislava runs project EUAMarket.com. Traders can use algorithmic trading on the exchange using web services using a dedicated programming language or via API.

== Security ==
CEB uses several guarantee systems, and settling company to provide additional security.

- Guarantee system 1 - collateral 2% of the contract value
- Guarantee system 2 - full payment or delivery before an order
- OTC market - no guarantees, only contact information is exchanged

=== Settlement ===
A dedicated settlement company provides additional security as two independent companies are required to sign the outgoing transaction. The settling company at CEB is LINNA.
