= Bob Snyder (artist) =

- Born: October 3, 1946 (age 80); Kalamazoo, Michigan, U.S.
- Education: Bachelor of Music, Roosevelt University; Master of Music, Roosevelt University
- Occupations: Composer, sound and video artist
- Known for: Electronic sound and visual work
- Works: Lines of Force* (1979), Trim Subdivisions* (1981)
- Awards: Featured in Whitney Biennials

Bob Snyder (born October 3, 1946) is an American composer, sound and video artist, who lives and works in Chicago. His work focuses on the formal relations between electronic sounds and images, using synthesized visual and audio signals as his main medium. Throughout his career, he has worked extensively with Sandin Image Processor, and his work has been featured in two Whitney Biennal exhibitions as well as institutions like the Museum of Modern Art, New York, the New York Public library and the Art Institute of Chicago. Several of his works have been made in collaboration with the artists Phil Morton, Tom DeFanti and Dan Sandin. Snyder is also the founder of the sound department at the School of the Art Institute of Chicago in its present form, where he was professor emeritus from 2016(?) until his retirement in 2022 after forty-six years at SAIC. He is the author of the book Music and Memory published by the MIT Press . He is also the author of the "Memory for Music" chapter in the 2009 and 2016 editions of the Oxford Handbook of Music Psychology. In 2020, Snyder contributed a chapter entitled “Repetitions and Silences: A Music and Memory Supplement” to the anthology Composition, Cognition, and Pedagogy, published by the Brazilian Association of Cognition and Musical Arts (ABCM).

== Early life ==
Snyder was born in 1946, in Kalamazoo, Michigan. Between 1962 and 1965 he attended the Interlochen Arts Academy boarding high school where he played bass clarinet in the touring orchestra. After graduating, Snyder studied composition and improvisation under the guidance of Bill Mathieu and Marjorie Hyams. Interested in both painting and music, Snyder pursued formal education in composition at Indiana University's Bachelor of Music program, enrolling in 1966. He later transferred to Roosevelt University where he completed his BM in 1970. He received his Master of Music from Roosevelt in 1972. During his studies he became interested in electronic music and began using an oscilloscope to explore the relation between audio and visual signals.

== Electronic visualization events ==
Shortly after graduating, Snyder enrolled into Dan Sandin's video art class at the University of Illinois Chicago in Chicago, where he was introduced to and began working with Sandin's Image Processor (IP). He later joined the Circle Graphics Habitat (today Electronic Visualization Laboratory), an interdisciplinary research group developed by Sandin and Tom DeFanti between 1973 and 1975 that centered around the IP and DeFanti's Graphic Symbiosis System (GRASS). While working with Sandin and DeFanti, Snyder met Phil Morton who at that time was teaching at the School of the Art Institute (SAIC) in Chicago. Snyder joined SAIC's faculty in 1974 and 1976 became the head of the Sound Area, later expanded into the School of the Art Institute's Sound Department.

Together with the community of electronic media artists including Phil Morton, Dan Sandin, Tom DeFanti, Jane Veeder, Jamie Fenton, Barbara Sykes and others, Snyder participated in the Electronic Visualization Events (EVE) organized by the Circle Graphics Habitat—a series of group shows focusing on experimental media performance and image processing. The first iteration of EVE, held in April 1975, featured a collaborative performance by Snyder-Morton-Sandin-DeFanti called Peano Boogie, an improvised piece for which Snyder provided the soundtrack. The group performed again a year later at the second EVE, showing their interactive work Ryral, for which Snyder used SAIC's EMU sound synthesizer. In the third event, which took place in May 1978, the group, joined by Jane Veeder, Sticks Raboin and Rylin Harris, performed a piece called Spiral 3. During the show, Snyder's collaboration with Morton and Guenther Tetz titled Data Bursts in 3 moves was also shown.

== Individual works ==
Snyder began recording his own IP experiments on videotape in 1974, eventually assembling his own copy of the machine. In his individual practice, Snyder focused on exploring video's and sound's shared formal properties. As he has explained in the article "Video Color Control by Means of an Equal-Tempered Keyboard" :

My hope was that both light and sound could be controlled from the same set of formal assumptions and that I could develop characteristic interval structures that would operate successfully in both areas.

In Lines of Force, created in 1979 and later featured in the Whitney Biennale's Video Program in 1981, abstract synthesized images are modulated with found-footage, such as video documentation of military tests and various recordings of television broadcast. Edited through a series of match-cuts, the piece follows the logic of a visual pun, juxtaposing shots sharing visual similarities. The soundtrack for the piece was composed after the visual part was finished.

In 1981, Snyder completed Trim Subdivisions, which has been featured at MoMA, the Art Institute of Chicago, and the Whitney Museum. Shot in suburban Indiana, and unlike most of Snyder's work, Trim Subdivision has no sound, and uses a wide range of editing techniques such as wipe-cuts in a playful deconstruction of site's uniform architecture.

From 1979 to 1984 he worked on his piece Spectral Brands, which was the first piece in which Snyder used the Image Processor keyboard interface. The instrument allowed for increased control over the machine, dividing its color space into 34220 separate colors organized according to the modified equal temperament tuning system.

In the late 2000s, Snyder produced a series of sound installations through Chicago's Experimental Sound Studio, including projects such as Orniphonia 2, made in 2013 as part of the ESS's Florasonic series, and Pseudorniphones, installed for the 2005 Outer Ear Festival of Sound in Chicago. For both of the works, Snyder created intricate soundscapes composed out of synthesized audio signals mimicking the sounds of songbirds.

In 2018, Snyder's work was included in the Chicago 1973-1992 exhibition at Gallery 400. The exhibition was curated by jonCates.

In 2021, Snyder collaborated with photographer Sara Livingston on the short film, One Year Dark, which was selected “Best Micro-Short” in the “Paris International Short Festival”, in September 2021.

=== Selected works ===
| Winter Notebook | 1975 |
| Icron | 1978 |
| Lines of Force | 1979 |
| Trim Subdivisions | 1981 |
| Spectral Brands | 1981 |
| Hard and Flexible Music | 1984 |
| Pseudorniphones | 2005 |
| Orniphonia 2 | 2013 |
| One Year Dark | 2021 |
