= Barbara Sykes (artist) =

American artist

Barbara Sykes (Barbara Sykes-Dietze) (born 1953) into a family of artists, designers and inventors. Since childhood, she has produced work in a variety of different art forms. In 1974, she became one of Chicago's pioneering video and new media artists and, later to include, independent video producer, exhibition curator and teacher. Sykes is a Chicago based experimental video artist who explores themes of spirituality, ritual and indigeneity from a feminist perspective. Sykes is known for her pioneering experimentation with computer graphics in her video work, utilizing the Electronic Visualization Laboratory at the University of Illinois, Chicago, at a time when this technology was just emerging. Her early works broke new grounds in Chicago's emerging New Media Art scene, and continue to inspire women to explore experimental realms. With a passion for community, she fostered significant collaborations with many institutions that include but are not limited to University of Illinois, School of the Art Institute of Chicago, Columbia College, Center for New Television, and (art)n laboratory. These collaborations became exemplary for the showcasing of new media work. The wave of video, new media and computer art that she pioneered alongside many other seminal early Chicago New Media artists persists as a major influence for artists and educators today. Her work has been exhibited internationally, at institutions such as Moderna Museet (Stockholm), Ny Carlsberg Glyptotek (Copenhagen), Musée d'Art Moderne de la Ville de Paris, Museum of Contemporary Art San Diego, Metropolitan Museum of Art (New York), Museum of the Art Institute (Chicago), The Metropolitan Museum of Art (New York) and SIGGRAPH. Sykes's tapes have been broadcast in Sweden, Italy, Puerto Rico and extensively throughout in the US, including "The Independents", PBS national broadcast, 1985, and national cablecast, 1984. Media Burn has an online selection of her tapes and over 200 of her raw footage, master edits, dubs and compilation tapes in their Independent Video Archives @ Barbara Sykes https://mediaburn.org/collections/videomakers-page/barbara-sykes/. Select grants include a National Endowment for the Arts and American Film Institute Regional Fellowship, Evanston Art Council Cultural Arts Fund and several Illinois Arts Council grants. In 2017, Sykes began to paint. In 2020, as the recipient of an Evanston Art Center Individual Artist Exhibition Award, Ethereal Abstractions, Sykes's first solo watercolor exhibition premiered 81paintings and she gave an online Artist Talk. Her paintings are lyrical, colorful abstractions reminiscent of organic shapes, ethereal forms and underwater landscapes - evocative impressions of spiritual and elemental worlds. They evoke the spontaneity and themes that have evolved from her previous body of time-based and digital artwork. In 2021, she moved to Florida. Her 2022 painting exhibitions/reviews include Forces of Nature showcased on the cover of Estero Life Magazine and she is in the article, Beholding Beauty: Artists of Estero Exhibit at COCO Art Gallery, the Florida Watercolor Society's 2022 Online Show, the 36th Annual All Florida Exhibition and Connections Art in Flight exhibit at the Southwest Florida International Airport, June 2022 to June 2023. She paints under the name of Barbara L. Sykes.

== Early influences ==
In the early 1970’s, Sykes worked as a commercial silk screener and then as an offset lithographer. Bored with her career, she decided to start a new career in the electronic arts. From 1974 to 1979 Sykes studied at the University of Illinois Chicago, during which experimental video art was developing in Chicago. The Electronic Visualization Laboratory was started by two UIC faculty, Tom Defanti (Computer Science) and Dan Sandin (Fine Art), and was influential in developing computer graphics with the goal of creating video art. The research lab known for developing the Sandin Image Processor, a video synthesizer is similar to synthesizers used to create music. The Image Processor allows for abstract analogue visuals to be created using analogue computer graphics, a new technology at the time. The lab was known for its Electronic Visualization Events (EVE), where live performances combined music and video processing in real time.

As a student of this new technology, Barbara Sykes quickly developed skills using the Image Processor and produced a large body of groundbreaking work, that includes Sykes's historically significant performances with Tom Defanti of The Poem during EVE I, 1975, and Circle 9 Sunrise during EVE II ,1976, at a time when such real-time performances were the first of their kind. For EVE III, 1978, Sykes produced Electronic Masks and Sykes and Defanti co-produced By the Crimson Bands of Cyttorak and Duals together. Real-time computer performances developed at the School of the Art Institute of Chicago, and the Electronic Visualization Laboratory at the University of Illinois at Chicago. Before earning an undergraduate degree, Sykes enrolled in the School of the Art Institute of Chicago, SAIC, emerging video program in 1979, and obtained her MFA in video, computers and performance in 1981.

While a student at the UIC, Sykes worked at their Media Production Center and as a freelance videographer and editor, producing dance, instructional and documentary videos. Concurrently, she was a UIC teaching assistant for graduate and undergraduate classes, providing instruction on the Sandin Image Processor, field production and editing. In graduate school at SAIC, she became proficient on the Rutt Etra Synthesizer and worked at the Video Data Bank co-coordinating Recent Work, a traveling video art exhibition, and documented visiting artists, including Ellen Fisher's performance, Call Her Amedia. She was also a broadcast post-production editor and cameraperson for a weekly Greek variety program that aired on PBS in Chicago and shot Chicago dance performances in order to fund her tuition.

== Career ==
Much of Sykes' work from the 1970s such as The Poem (1975), Circle 9 Sunrise (1976), Movement Within (1976), Reflections (1976), Off the Air (1977), Environmental Symmetry (1978) and By The Crimson Bands of Cyttorak (1978) utilized the Sandin Image Processor to create tapes as montages of meditative, poetic abstractions and her multimedia installations and interactive performance environments. While the nature of the Image Processor allows for limited analogue control, with much of the process left up to chance and experimentation, Sykes's mastery of the Image Processor distinguished her work from other artists in the field. Notable, her pioneering figurative tapes, Electronic Masks (1978) and Emanations (1979), illustrate the innovative work created solely using the IP's oscillators and editing. In 1977, Gene Siskel, film critic and host of Nightwatch, interviewed Sykes about her work and performance of Circle 9 Sunrise during this live television program on WTTW, PBS, Chicago. Her later works evolved into lyrical video poems, mystical stories and experimental ethnographic documentaries that demonstrate more personal and expressive narratives and themes. They showcased her strength as a storyteller grounded with an aesthetic sophistication of great emotional depth that depicted the underlying sacred nature of the people and events portrayed. Shiva Darsan (1994) and Song of the River (1997) are among these works. Sykes created videos that "reflect her interests in female mythological figures, rituals, dance, art, and music of other cultures as well as depicting dream states and fantasized visions." While this later work is different in process, there are clear relationships to her earlier work, as is evident in Electronic Masks (1976), which demonstrates a blend of image processing with themes of spirituality.

Song of the River, shot in Borneo, was created during Sykes's 14-month sabbatical in research and video production throughout Asia, the Middle East and Africa. While there, she visited various indigenous tribes and was interested in learning about their spiritual relationships, and how these relationships are evident in everyday life. In a statement about the film, Sykes describes that "from birth to death, special rights and ceremonies mark the important events of one's existence, assuring a symbiosis of body and soul with the divine. This deep relationship between the people and their gods are reaffirmed through daily activity. At times, the person symbolically becomes god, strengthening their own sense of sacredness and self-respect." These themes are continued in Shiva Darsan, shot in Nepal, another video in her series "In Celebration of Life... In Celebration of Death..." Shiva Darsan discusses the Hindu god Shiva through a personal account of Sykes's visit to the Shivaratri Festival at the Pashupatinath Temple. "In Celebration of Life... In Celebration of Death..." which was funded by a Chicago Artists Abroad Artist Residency and Columbia College, won several awards throughout 1994 and 1995 including the CINE Golden Eagle Award, First place at the Hollywood Spiritual Film and Entertainment Festival, First place Documentary Award at La Crosse Video Festival, Certificate of Merit in the Religious and Ethics Category at Intercom/Chicago International Film Festival and First place Documentary Award at La Crosse Video Festival, among others. The series was also shown at a variety of video festivals, such as the Banff Mountain Film Festival, the Canadian International Film and Video Festival, the Parnu International Visual Anthropology Film Festival in Estonia, the XI International Women's Film Festival in Madrid, Spain, the 12th International Hamburg Short Film Festival in Germany, the Festival International de la creation Video et Cinematographique in Manosque, France, the Festival of Illinois Film and Video Artists in Chicago, and the Three Rivers Arts Festival. Her last experimental ethnographic documentary, Amma, A Documentary of a Living Saint, is an extraordinarily powerful portrayal of Mata Amritanandamayi, a world-renown woman spiritual leader and global social activist.

Besides creating artwork, Barbara Sykes has had a notable presence in the Chicago new media scene. In the late 1970s she became involved with The Center for New Television (formerly The Chicago Editing Center) where she would host video workshops and screen her work. In 1981, Sykes curated Video: Chicago Style, which was exhibited at Global Village in New York City, and was additionally screened on Manhattan Cable. This exhibition eventually grew into Video and Computer Art: Chicago Style, which she presented along with Sykes's Retrospective, her one-woman exhibition, throughout Japan, Australia, Spain and was the first woman video artist to present in China, 1988-1989.

Sykes was a tenured, Professor of Television at Columbia College Chicago from 1982 to 2005. She taught experimental video production and advanced and intermediate level field productions and editing courses. While at Columbia College, she also served as video coordinator and as initiator and director of the visiting artist and lecturer series for the Department of Television, organizing lectures by industry professionals and artists such as Gene Youngblood, author of Expanded Cinema, Barbara London, curator at the Museum of Modern Art in New York, Marlon Riggs, filmmaker and gay rights activist, and Rafael Franca, which occurred in conjunction with "Brazilian Video Art", the first ever exhibition of Brazilian experimental video work in Chicago.

In 1996 and 1997, Sykes was a featured artist in the Museum of Contemporary Art, Chicago's retrospective exhibition "Art in Chicago, 1945-1995" and included in the companion book produced for this show. In 2016 Sykes took part in Celebrating Women in New Media Arts, a panel symposium held at the School of the Art Institute of Chicago. The symposium highlighted women who have paved the way in the male dominated field of new media. Joan Truckenbrod and Claudia Hart were among some of the participants who shared their experiences making technological artwork as women, and some of the challenges they faced. The symposium preceded and helped to promote the 2018 release of the book New Media Futures: The Rise of Women in the Digital Arts published by the University of Illinois Press. New Media Futures captures the contributions of twenty-two trailblazing mid-western women creators that were integral to the development of the digital arts and at the forefront of social change, technical innovation and artistic inquiry. New Media Futures featured artists and contributors are Barbara Sykes, Ellen Sandor, Donna Cox, Janine Fron, Carolina Cruz-Niera, Tiffany Holmes, Maxine Brown, Brenda Laurel, Copper Giloth, Jane Veeder, Martyl Langsdorf, Annette Barbier, Joan Truckenbrod, Claudia Hart, Margaret Dolinsky, Dana Plepys, Colleen Bushell, Nan Goggin, Mary Rasmussen, Sally Rosenthal, Lucy Petrovic and Abina Manning. Sykes and the other women in New Media Futures have participated in its book tours and HerStory presentations.

In 2018, Sykes' work By The Crimson Bands of Cyttorak was included in the Chicago New Media 1973-1992 exhibition curated by jonCates.

List of Selected Works
Title	Year
The Poem	1975
EVE I	1975
Circle 9 Sunrise	1976
A Movement Within	1976
EVE II	1976
Electronic Masks	1978
By The Crimson Bands of Cyttorak	1978
Duals	1978
EVE III	1978
Emanations	1979
Waking	1979
I Dream of Dreaming	1980
Sketching a Motion	1981
Witness	1982
Kalyian	1986
d/stabilize/d	1987
Shiva Darsan	1994
Song of the River	1997
Amma: A Documentary of a Living Saint	2007

== See also ==
- Electronic Visualization Laboratory
- SIGGRAPH
- Video Art
- Computer Graphics
