= Jane Veeder =

American digital artist, filmmaker and educator

- Education: California College of the Arts, School of the Art Institute of Chicago
- Known for: Digital art, filmmaker, educator

Jane Veeder (born 1944) is an American digital artist, filmmaker and educator. She is a professor at San Francisco State University in the Department of Design and Industry, at which she held the position of chair between 2012 and 2015. Veeder is best known for her pioneering work in early computer graphics, however she has also worked extensively with traditional art forms such as painting, ceramics, theatre, and photography.

Veeder moved away from traditional art making and began her work in the digital arts in 1976 after her enrollment in the graduate program at the School of the Art Institute of Chicago (SAIC) where she first discovered video as an artistic medium. In 1982, her video 'Montana' became the first computer graphics piece to be featured in the video collection of the Museum of Modern Art in New York. Her video work typically involves working with a computer to create the images, rather than a video recorder, to achieve a more direct relationship between the artist and the piece. Many pieces are meant to involve participation between the viewer and the work itself. Veeder's work marks some of the significant steps that took digital technology into the fine arts, which never had been done previously.

== Early life and education ==
Both of Jane Veeder's parents were artists, her mother was a painter and her father was a photographer. From 1967 until 1969, Veeder studied ceramic sculptures and photography at California College of Arts and Crafts (now known as the California College of the Arts) and graduated with a BFA degree. In the early 1970s, Veeder moved from California to the neighborhood of Pilsen in Chicago, Illinois.

From 1975 until 1977, Veeder pursued her MFA degree at The School of the Art Institute of Chicago (SAIC) where she studied video and filmmaking. While studying at SAIC in 1976, she first met Phil Morton, the founder of the Video Department at SAIC. Soon after meeting, their individual art practices became heavily influenced by each other. New technologies and artistic communities were emerging at this time. Their collaboration resulted in them creating a number of programs from scratch. After enrolling in the School of the Art Institute of Chicago's MFA program, Veeder began taking film classes. By the end of her first year at SAIC, Veeder had discovered video as an artistic medium and switched entirely from studying Ceramic Sculpture to studying Video and Film.

== Early career in computer graphics ==
Veeder's knowledge of photography lead her to experiment with video art, eventually working across multiple program platforms. These included Bally Home Computer/Arcade, and ZGRASS computer language which was eventually combined with Sandin Image Processor. The burgeoning professional video game industry in Chicago gave Veeder an outlet to put her theories into practice.

Veeder collaborated with Phil Morton to create the video art pieces "Program #7" and "Program #9" in 1978.

== Collaborative work ==
=== Program #7 ===
Between 1976 and 1982, Jane Veeder traveled the western mountains of the United States with Phil Morton. On these road trips the two would shoot video of their surroundings using a portable video recorder. Some of these video recordings of the western mountain terrain were used to produce the televised video piece known as Program #7. Program #7 was produced as a part of a larger group of videos known as The Electronic Visualization Center: A Television Research Satellite to the School of the Art Institute of Chicago. Program #7 was televised on Chicago Public Television as a part of a program which ran work by independent video creators. Program #7 was created using a Sandin Image Processor and a Bally Home Computer. Graphics generated using a Bally Home Computer would be overlaid overtop of the video recorded by Veeder and Morton using the Sandin Image Processor. The Sandin Image Processor would also be used to add varying patterns to the image.

=== The Paint Problem ===
Veeder coauthored the article titled The Paint Problem with Copper Giloth in 1985. The article, meant for IEEE Computer Graphics and Applications, analyzed the ways in which computer art programs were emulating real world processes digitally rather than making use of the unique capabilities that computers had to offer. Veeder and Giloth argued that Computer graphics was not just a tool to make your existing processes faster but rather an entirely new set of tools with an entirely new set of capabilities that had yet to be taken advantage of.

== Solo work ==
Over the span of her career, Jane Veeder has worked on many independent projects, Several of these projects have been exhibited at the SIGGRAPH Art Show.

In 1982, Veeder created several works utilizing the capabilities of the Datamax UV-1 Zgrass Graphics Computer. She continued to use the Datamax UV-1 for several more projects in the years to come.

Veeder first exhibited her digitally synthesized work at the 1982 SIGGRAPH Art Show. At the 1982 conference, Veeder exhibited her works, Bubblespiral, Montana, Warpitpout, and Bustergrid.

Her video piece titled Montana piece would go on to become the first computer graphics video piece to be featured in the Museum of Modern Art's Video Collection.

Bubblespiral is a 2-Dimensional printed piece measuring 21.5 x 28 inches in size. Montana is an interactive piece incorporating computer synthesized graphics. The piece was displayed as a video and has a duration of 3:05 minutes. Warpitout is an interactive piece that incorporates realtime morphing of an image of the players face. The player could use the controls on the unit to distort the image of themselves in realtime. Bustergrid is another 2-Dimensional printed artwork created using computer graphics measuring 21.5 x 28 inches in size, the same dimensions as Bubblespiral

One year later in 1983, Veeder only produced one artwork that would be shown at that years SIGGRAPH Art Show, the piece, titled Floater, is a 6:12 minuter long real-time computer generated video piece. Again, two years later, at the 1985 SIGGRAPH Art Show Veeder only exhibited one work. The work exhibited that year, titled Vizgame and was a computer generated interactive artwork. The piece allowed the player to build a real-time generated animation on a 16-square grid, allowing the player to control the animation of each block.

In 2018 Veeder work was included in the Chicago New Media 1973-1992 exhibition, curated by Jon Cates.
