= Phil Morton =

American video artist and activist (1945–2003)

Phil Morton (1945–2003) was an influential American video artist and activist who founded the Video Area in 1970 at the School of the Art Institute of Chicago, where he taught for many years.

== Biography ==
The Video Area that Morton founded was the first department in the United States to offer college degrees in Video art, through the School of the Art Institute of Chicago. The Video Area eventually became the Video Department, which later became part of the Film, Video & New Media Department. Frequent visitors and collaborators in the Video Area during the 1970s included Steina and Woody Vasulka, Gene Youngblood, Dan Sandin, Timothy Leary, Barbara Buckner and many other active and founding members of the early Video art community. Morton introduced analog and digital computers into the curriculum of the Video Area and the School in the 1970s through the use of the Sandin Image Processor, a patch-programmable analog computer optimized for video processing and synthesis developed from 1971 - 1973, and The Bally Astrocade Arcade Video Game System, a programmable home video game console developed in 1974. Morton's playful, critical, self-reflexive and conversational Video art works, projects and performances often involved ongoing collaborations. In particular, Morton collaborated extensively with artists Jane Veeder, Dan Sandin, Tom DeFanti and Jamie Fenton.

=== Copy-it-right ===
In 1973, Morton asked Dan Sandin if he could build the first copy of Sandin's original Sandin Image Processor. Sandin and Morton then began to work together to create the schematic plans for the Sandin Image Processor, a document they called the Distribution Religion. Through The Distribution Religion, Sandin open sourced his Sandin Image Processor, giving the plans away for only the cost of making Xerox copies and mailing them while incorporating any additions or modifications made by those who built their own Sandin Image Processor into any further releases of the Distribution Religion.

Morton developed an approach he called COPY-IT-RIGHT, an anti-copyright approach to making and freely sharing Media art. The Distribution Religion and Morton's individual and collaborative Media art works were released under his COPY-IT-RIGHT license. COPY-IT-RIGHT encouraged people to make faithful copies, caring for and distributing the work as widely as possible.

== Exhibitions ==
During his life, Morton's Video art works were exhibited at the Museum of Modern Art (New York), the Museum of Contemporary Art, Chicago, the Iverson Museum of Art (New York) and the 1975 São Paulo Art Biennial (Brazil). His Video art works were also shown on television stations such as WNET (New York), WGBH (Boston) and WTTW (Chicago) and reviewed in magazines such as Artforum and New Art Examiner. In 2007 the "Distribution Religion" exhibition at The Art Gallery of Knoxville was inspired by and featured the work of Phil Morton.

== Legacy ==
The Phil Morton Memorial Research Archive (located in the Film, Video & New Media Department at the School of the Art Institute of Chicago) seeks to coordinate and freely distribute Phil Morton's Media art work and associated research under Morton's COPY-IT-RIGHT license. jonCates initiated the Phil Morton Memorial Research Archive in 2007 after receiving a generous donation of Phil Morton's personal video archive/database from Morton's surviving partner Barb Abramo. The Film, Video & New Media Department presented "COPY-IT-RIGHT! Selections from The Phil Morton Memorial Research Archive" at The Gene Siskel Film Center on Thursday, February 15, 2007. The program included excerpts from Morton's "General Motors" and the complete works of "Program # 9 (Amateur TV)" by Morton and Veeder and "SAIC Memo".

Morton's work still maintains relevance and importance in the history of New Media. General Motors in 2018 was exhibited at the Chicago New Media 1973-1992 exhibition, curated by jonCates. A lot of the videos he collected in the Video Data Bank archive were also included in the exhibition.
