= Robert Snyder =

Robert or Bob Snyder may refer to:

- Bob Snyder (American football) (1913–2001), American football player and coach
- Bob Snyder (musician), American musician
- Bob Snyder (artist) (born 1946), American composer, sound and video artist
- Robert Snyder (filmmaker) (1916–2004), documentary filmmaker
- Robert C. Snyder (1919–2011), American professor of English at Louisiana Tech University
- Robert H. Snyder (1855–1906), American politician from Louisiana
- Robert O. Snyder (1917–2016), American politician from Missouri
- Robert Michael Snyder (born 1954), American author and US Chess Master
- Robert Snyder (civil servant), American soldier and Acting Secretary of Veteran Affairs
- Robert J. Snyder, attorney in the United States Supreme Court case In re Snyder
