= Bruce H. McCormick =

American computer scientist (1928–2007)

Bruce Howard McCormick (1928–2007) was an American computer scientist, Emeritus Professor at the Department of Computer Science, and founding director of the Brain Networks Lab at Texas A&M University.

== Biography ==
McCormick took his BS in Physics from MIT in 1950, followed by two years on a Fulbright Scholarship to Cambridge University, England. There he studied quantum field theory with Professor Paul Dirac, founder of the field of quantum mechanics and holder of the 1933 Nobel Prize in Physics, shared with Professor Erwin Schrödinger. McCormick returned to the U.S. to take his PhD in physics at Harvard University in 1955, with the thesis "Two investigations in meson theory in the non-relativistic limit". He then became a Postdoctoral Fellow at Brookhaven National Laboratory.

In 1957 McCormick accepted a post as staff physicist at the Alvarez Hydrogen Bubble Chamber Group at the Lawrence Berkeley Laboratory. The Chamber Group was led by Dr. Luis Alvarez, who later won the 1968 Nobel Prize in Physics. In 1960 Dr. McCormick began 12 years at the University of Illinois at Urbana-Champaign where he was a professor of physics, computer science, and bioengineering. Afterwards, he served as head of the electrical engineering and computer science department at the University of Illinois at Chicago. McCormick joined Texas A&M in 1983 as the first department head of the newly formed Department of Computer Science in the Dwight Look College of Engineering. In August 2005 Dr. McCormick retired from Texas A&M but continued his research there, exploring and understanding the complexity and scaling properties of the brain's microcircuit structure.

McCormick died the first week of December 2007 in Rio Rancho, New Mexico.

== Publications ==
McCormick has authored numerous books and articles.

Books

- 1966. Design concepts for an information resource center with option of an attached automated laboratory. With A. M. Richardson.
- 1968. Pattern articulation unit of Illiac III; homogenous Boolean functions in the iterative array. William J. Watson and Richard T. Borovec.
- 1968. Illiac III programming manual. Edited with R. Lansford.
- 1970. Illiac III computer system; brief description and annotated bibliography.
- 1971. Illiac III reference manual. Edited with B.J. Nordmann and others.
- 1971. Interval generalization of switching theory. With R.S. Michalski.
- 1972. Analysis of texture. With S. N. Jayaramamurthy.
- 1987. Visualization in Scientific Computing. Edited with Thomas A. DeFanti and Maxine D. Brown. ACM Press.

Articles, a selection

- 1987. "The Usable Intersection of PC Graphics and NTSC Video Recording". With D.J. Sandin. In: IEEE Computer Graphics and Applications. Oct. 1987, pp. 50–58.
- 1987. "Visualization in Scientific Computing". With T.A. DeFanti and M.D. Brown. In: Computer Graphics. Vol. 21, No. 6, Nov. 1987.
- 1988. "Scientific Animation Workstations". With M.D. Brown. in: SuperComputing. Fall 1988, pp. 10–13.
- 1989. "Scientific Animation Workstations: Creating an Environment for Remote Research, Education, and Communication". With M.D. Brown. In: Academic Computing. Feb. 1989, pp. 10–12, 55-57.
- 1989. "Insight Through Images". With M.D. Brown. In: UNIX Review. Mar. 1989, pp. 42–50.
- 1989. "Visualization: Expanding Scientific and Engineering Research Opportunities". With Thomas A. DeFanti and Maxine D. Brown. In: Computer. vol. 22, no. 8, pp. 12–25, Aug., 1989
- 1990. "Advanced visualization environments: knowledge-based image modeling". In: Visualization in supercomputing. July 1990. Pp 135–150.
- 1997. "Grid generation for brain visualization at the cellular and tissue level". With David A. Batte. In: CNS '96: Proceedings of the annual conference on Computational neuroscience : trends in research, 1997. New York : Plenum Press.
