= Barbara Sykes =

Barbara Sykes may refer to:

- Barbara Sykes (artist) (born 1953), American artist
- Barbara Sykes (politician), American politician from Ohio
