= IBM 2250 =

Vector graphics display system by IBM for the System/360

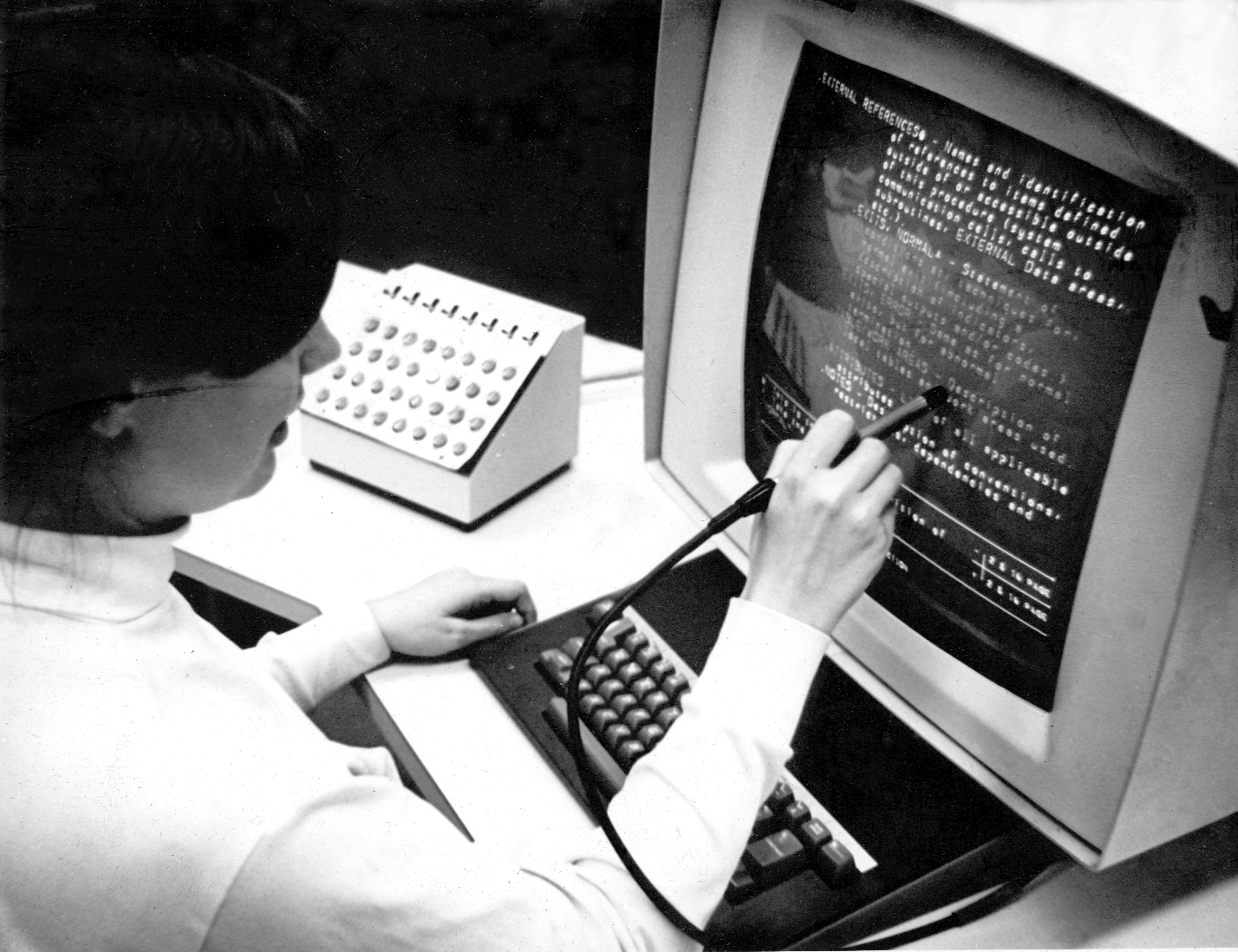
- IBM 2250 Model IV display station, including light pen and programmed function keyboard.
- Also known as: IBM 2250 Graphics Display Unit
- Manufacturer: IBM
- Type: vector graphics display system
- Release date: 1964; 62 years ago
- Introductory price: around US$280,000 (equivalent to $2,267,112 in 2024)
- Input: light pen, keyboard, function keypad

The IBM 2250 Graphics Display Unit was a vector graphics display system by IBM for the System/360; the Model IV attached to the IBM 1130.

== Overview ==
The IBM 2250 Graphics Display Unit was announced with System/360 in 1964. A complete 2250 III system with controller cost around $280,000 in 1970, though up to 4 displays could share a single controller, reducing the cost per display by up to 40%.

A display list of line segments (vectors) on a 1024 by 1024 grid was stored in computer's memory or an optional buffer on the 2250 and repainted on the 2250's CRT up to 40 times per second. The computer altered the display by changing the display list.

Characters were built of line segments specified by display list subroutines. Thus any character set or font could be displayed, although fonts were generally extremely simplified for performance reasons. An optional character-generator feature on all models provided predefined fonts of 63 characters to simplify display of alphanumeric information.

The 2250 was housed in a desk with an alphanumeric (QWERTY) keyboard and a separate programmed function keyboard which had keys, indicator lights and switches. A plastic overlay label could be placed over the function keyboard. Punches on the top edge of the overlay could be sensed by the computer so the keys, lights and switches could be reprogrammed simply by changing overlays. The 2250s CRT measured 21" diagonal, but the useful display area was 12 inch by 12 inch, or about 17 inches diagonal. A light pen was provided as a pointing device, serving the function of the modern computer mouse.

An IBM 2285 Display Copier could be attached to the 2250 to provide 8½ by 11 inch hard copy of the display contents under operator control.

An IBM 2280 Film Recorder or IBM 2282 Film Recorder/Scanner could be attached to a 2840 control unit providing for output or input/output to photographic negative.

There were four models of 2250:

- Model 1 – attached directly to a System/360 via a selector or multiplexor channel.
- Model 2 – attached via a 2840-1 control unit. A 2840 could attach up to four 2250s and provided buffering and a character generator.
- Model 3 – attached via a 2840-2 control unit.
- Model 4 – attached to an IBM 1130 minicomputer via the storage access channel (SAC). The 1130 could run either as a standalone processor or as a front-end processor connected to a remote System/360.

== Competitors ==
A number of plug compatible manufacturers sold competitors to the 2250, including Adage, Evans & Sutherland, Information Displays Inc., Lundy, Sanders, Spectragraphics, and Vector General.

== Successors ==
In 1977 IBM introduced the 3250 Display System (manufactured by Sanders Associates) as an upgrade to the 2250.

== See also ==
- IBM 740
- Tektronix 4014
- IBM 3179G
- Digital Equipment Corporation DEC GT40
