= Treasure Cove =

1983 video game

- The cover of Treasure Cove's manual
- Developer: Spectre Systems
- Publisher: Esoterica
- Designer: Brett Bilbrey
- Composer: David Moses
- Platform: Astrocade
- Release: April 1983
- Genre: Action
- Modes: Single-player, Multiplayer

Treasure Cove is an action video game by Spectre Systems released in 1983 for the Astrocade. Players control a scuba diver who collects treasure while avoiding various sea creatures. It was published by Esoterica under the Spectrecade label and developed by Brett Bilbrey with music by David Moses. It was one of the first Astrocade games released on a ROM cartridge by a third-party. Critics consider its visuals and sound to be impressive for the time period and a great showing for the under performing console.

== Gameplay ==
Treasure Cove is a scuba diving based action game. Players control a scuba diver who dives from a boat sailing back and forth at the top of the screen to retrieve treasure stuck at the bottom. The player can pick up one piece of treasure at a time, bringing it back to their boat each time. Various forms of sea life, including a blue octopus that always stays at the bottom of the screen, will kill the player if contact is made. The scuba diver will also die if they run out of air. It is possible to move faster by holding down the action button, but this depletes the air supply more quickly. Once every piece of treasure has been retrieved, the scuba diver moves on to a new cove, which contains one new sea creature out of 25 in total.

There is both a single player mode and a multiplayer tournament mode that allows up to four players. Players can also choose how many lives to start with, up to a maximum of nine. Adaptations of various sea shanties play during gameplay, including a rendition of "Blow the Man Down". A notable feature for the time was the option to turn the background music off.

== Development ==
Treasure Cove was developed Brett Bilbrey for Spectre Systems. It was published by Esoterica through the Spectrecade label. It was one of the first cartridges released by a third-party developer for the Astrocade. Music was arranged by George Moses, a Michigan-based musician and Astrocade enthusiast who had used the Astrocade sound chip to produce music both for standalone cassettes and cassette-based video games.

The second level of the game featuring the diver, turtles, fish, an octopus, four balls representing treasure, and the diver's boat.

== Reception ==
The Video Game Update recommended Treasure Cove calling the opening screen "impressive", the sea creatures "recognizable", and the gameplay "extremely challenging". They said it would be worth a purchase "even if the Astrocade were not starving for new games." Mark Browstein writing for Video Games thought the gameplay was "challenging" and the graphics "more than adequate." He also enjoyed the music and recommended buying it, not just because of its quality, but also to support the production of more third-party cartridges. In 2007, Brett Weiss said it was an "audio/visual extravaganza" and "a good example of why the Astrocade should have been home to more third-party releases"
