= Maxine D. Brown =

American computer scientist

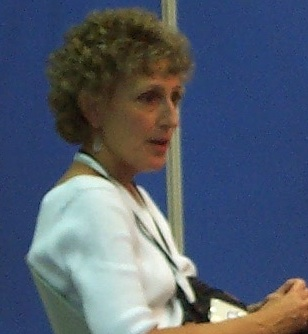
- Brown in 2000
- Occupation: Director of the Electronic Visualization Laboratory

Academic background
- Education: Temple University
- Alma mater: University of Pennsylvania

Academic work
- Discipline: Computer science
- Sub-discipline: Scientific visualization
- Institutions: University of Illinois at Chicago

Maxine D. Brown is an American computer scientist and retired director of the Electronic Visualization Laboratory (EVL) at the University of Illinois at Chicago (UIC). Along with Tom DeFanti and Bruce McCormick, she co-edited the 1987 NSF report, Visualization in Scientific Computing, which defined the field of scientific visualization.

== Biography ==
Brown holds a B.A. in Mathematics from Temple University and an M.S. in Computer Science from the University of Pennsylvania.

Prior to coming to the University of Illinois at Chicago in 1986, Brown was a professional communications consultant specializing in technical communications for the computer graphics industry. Until October 1983, she was Director of Documentation at Digital Productions. She was formerly with ISSCO Graphics, a supplier of data representation graphics software, working in the documentation, development, and marketing areas. She has also worked at Hewlett-Packard, in both their research and development groups and in marketing. In the 1987 she became associate director of the Electronic Visualization Laboratory (EVL) at the University of Illinois at Chicago, responsible for the funding, documentation, and promotion of its research activities. She works closely with EVL's collaborators at the National Center for Supercomputing Applications (NCSA) at the University of Illinois at Urbana-Champaign and the Mathematics and Computer Science Division at Argonne National Laboratory to coordinate research activities.

Brown is also a steering committee member of the Pacific Rim Applications and Grid Middleware Assembly (PRAGMA), a founding member of GLIF, the Global Lambda Integrated Facility, a global group that manages international switched wavelength networks for research and education, and co-chair (with Larry Smarr) of the GLIF Research & Applications (RAP) working group. Brown has also served co-chair of international grid (iGrid) demonstrations, notably iGrid 1998 at SC.98 in Orlando, Florida; iGrid 2000 at INET in Yokohama, Japan; iGrid 2002 in Amsterdam, the Netherlands; and, iGrid 2005 in San Diego, California.

Maxine Brown was a recipient of the 1990 UIC Chancellor's Academic Professional Excellence (CAPE) award, and the recipient of the 1998 SIGGRAPH Outstanding Service Award. and the 2001 UIC Merit Award.

== Publications ==
Brown has authored numerous articles and papers. A selection:

- 1987. "Visualization in Scientific Computing". Edited with Bruce H. McCormick and Thomas A. DeFanti. ACM Press.
- 1988. "Imcomp -- An Image Compression and Conversion Algorithm for the Efficient Transmission, Storage, and Display of Color Images". With M. Krogh. In: NCSA Data Link. Vol. 2, No. 3, National Center for Supercomputing Applications, June 1988, pp. 11– 24
- 1989. "Scientific Animation Workstations: Creating an Environment for Remote Research, Education, and Communication". With T.A. DeFanti. In: Academic Computing, Feb. 1989, pp. 10–12, 55–57.
- 1995. "Virtual Environments and Distributed Computing at SC'95: GII Testbed and HPC Challenge Applications on the I-WAY." Edited with H. Korab. Published by ACM/IEEE Supercomputing '95, December 1995.
- 1996. "Virtual Reality Over High Speed Networks." With T. DeFanti and R.Stevens. In: IEEE Computer Graphics and Applications, Vol 16.4, July 1996, pp. 42–43.
- 1997. "The ImmersaDesk and Infinity Wall Projection-Based Virtual Reality Displays". With Marek Czernuszenko, Dave Pape, Daniel Sandin, Tom DeFanti and Gregory L. Dawe. In: Computer Graphics. May 1997.
- 1997. "Global Tele-Immersion: Better Than Being There". With Jason Leigh, Thomas A. DeFanti, Andrew E. Johnson, and Daniel J. Sandin.
- 1999. "Visualization. Expanding Scientific and Engineering Research Opportunities". With Thomas A. DeFanti and Bruce H. McCormick. In: Readings in information Visualization: Using Vision to Think, pages 39–56.
- 2002. "Teleimmersion and Visualization with the OptIPuter". With others. Proceedings of the 12th International Conference on Artificial Reality and Telexistence (ICAT 2002), The University of Tokyo, Japan, December 3–6, 2002.
