= Michael E. Papka =

Computer scientist

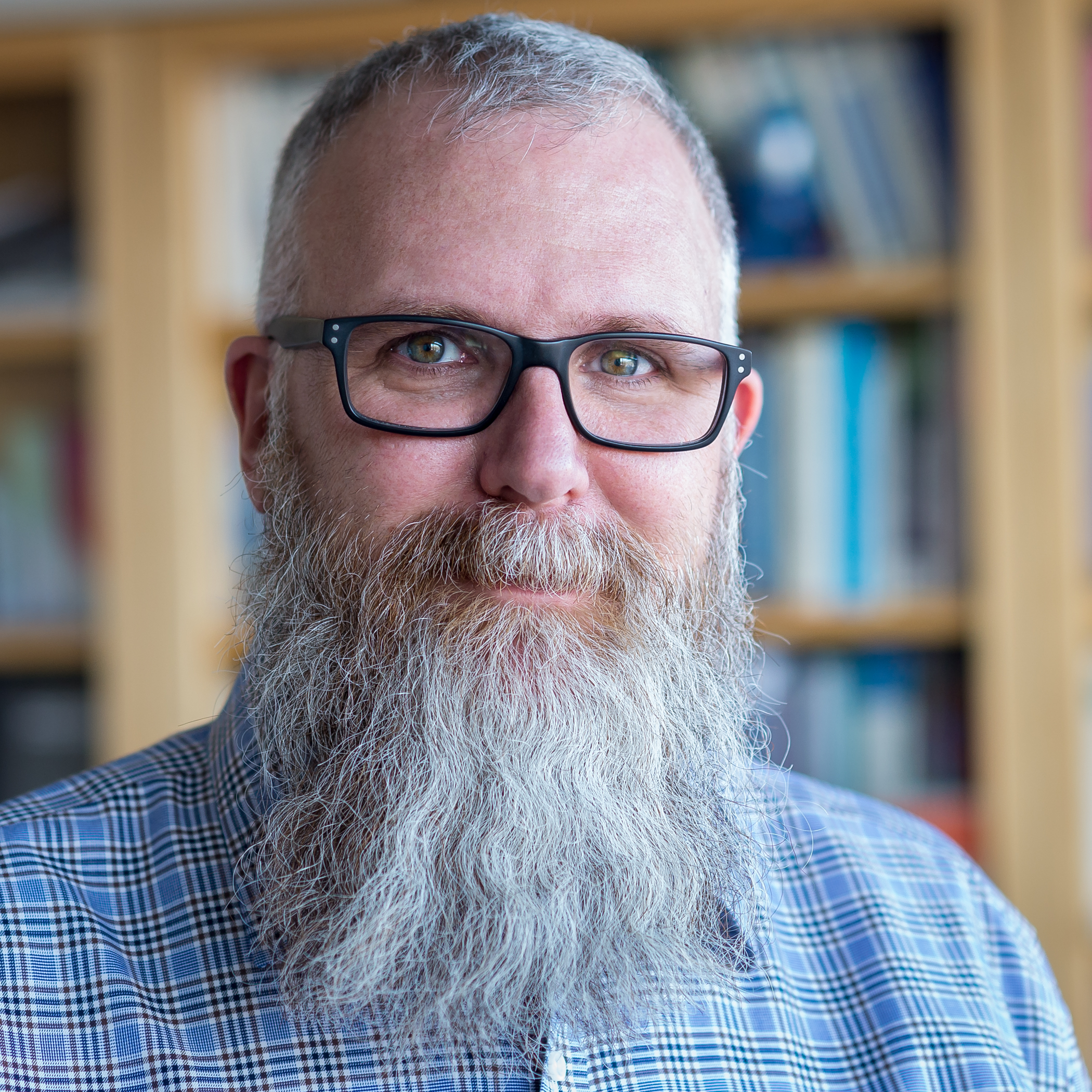
- Michael E. Papka (2023)
- Education: University of Chicago (PhD) University of Illinois Chicago Northern Illinois University
- Website: www.anl.gov/profile/michael-e-papka

Michael E. Papka is a Warren S. McCulloch professor of computer science at the University of Illinois Chicago. At Argonne National Laboratory, he works as a senior scientist, the deputy associate laboratory director for Computing, Environment, and Life Sciences (CELS), and the director of the Argonne Leadership Computing Facility. Additionally, Papka is the director of the Electronic Visualization Laboratory and co-director of the George Crabtree Institute for Discovery and Sustainability. Previously, Papka was a named Presidential Research, Scholarship and Artistry Professor at Northern Illinois University.

== Education and career ==
Papka has a physics degree from Northern Illinois University, a master's degree in electrical engineering and computer science from the University of Illinois at Chicago, and a master's degree and PhD from the University of Chicago.

While studying at UIC, Papka worked at Argonne National Laboratory as an associate scientist (1992–1996) and has been steadily promoted throughout his research career, achieving senior scientist rank in 2012. In his role as a deputy associate laboratory director (2006 – present) for Computing, Environment and Life Sciences, Papka co-directs a research directorate that couples computing-related activities with various science domains whose future depends on computing. As the director of the Argonne Leadership Computing Facility a U.S. Department of Energy (DOE) Office of Science User Facility, Papka leads the development and deployment of Aurora, one of the world's first exascale supercomputers.

At University of Illinois Chicago, Papka is a member of the SPEAR Laboratory and Honors College. His active research includes scientific visualization, large-scale data analysis, and building research infrastructure. His current efforts focused on analyzing the data output of traditional supercomputers, large-scale scientific instruments, and sensor networks to integrate edge and high-performance computing across the computing continuum. As director of the Electronic Visualization Laboratory, he leads an interdisciplinary laboratory that performs research in the areas of high-performance visualization, virtual reality, and networked collaboration. EVL is home to pioneering technologies such as CAVE, SAGE, and CAVE2.

== Research ==
Papka's research focuses on data analysis and visualization and has resulted in the collaborative development of techniques and tools for enabling a broad range of scientific discoveries. His most significant contribution is in high-performance computing systems. His record extends from work on terascale systems to petascale and, most recently, exascale. Papka was lead researcher on the Argonne Teragrid Grid Integration Group and co-lead researcher of an NSF funded project on TeraGrid Early Operations. With the advent of petascale systems, Papka was lead researcher on an NSF funded petascale data active store. He co-authored the heavily cited 2011 International Exascale Software Project Roadmap. At ISC High Performance 2024, Argonne's exascale system, Aurora, broke the exascale barrier and was ranked as the fastest AI system in the world dedicated to AI for open science.

== Awards and honors ==
Papka's honors include the Gordon Bell Special Prize for HPC-Based COVID-19 Research (2022) and a Gordon Bell Prize [honorable mention] for scientific visualization (2011). Papka also received the Argonne Distinguished Performance Award for leadership of ALCF and overseeing Aurora's construction (2023), an Argonne Pinnacle of Education Award for his contributions to science education outreach activities (2022), and a Secretary of Energy Achievement Award for marshaling HPC resources for research during the COVID-19 pandemic. He was named an ACM Distinguished Member in 2023.

== Selected publications ==
- Cruz-Neira, C.; Leigh, J.; Papka, M.; et al. (October 25, 1993). "Scientists in wonderland: A report on visualization applications in the CAVE virtual reality environment". Proceedings of 1993 IEEE Research Properties in Virtual Reality Symposium. pp. 59–66. doi:10.1109/VRAIS.1993.378262.
- DeFanti, Thomas A.; Foster, Ian; Papka, Michael E.; et al. (June 1996). "Overview of the I-Way: Wide-Area Visual Supercomputing". The International Journal of Supercomputer Applications and High Performance Computing. 10 (2–3): 123–131. doi:10.1177/109434209601000201 – via SAGE.
- Childers, L.; Disz, T.; Olson, R.; Papka, M.E. (July 12, 2000). "Access grid: Immersive group-to-group collaborative visualization". 4th International Immersive Projection Technology Workshop. OSTI 759072 – via OSTI.GOV.
- Catlett, C.; et al. (2008). "TeraGrid: Analysis of Organization, System Architecture, and Middleware Enabling New Types of Applications". Advances in Parallel Computing. 16. hdl:2022/14524 – via Scholarworks.
- Dongarra, Jack; et al. (January 6, 2011). "The International Exascale Software Project roadmap". The International Journal of High Performance Computing Applications. 25 (1): 3–60. doi:10.1177/1094342010391989 – via SAGE.
- Zvyagin, Maxim; Brace, Alexander; Hippe, Kyle (October 27, 2023). "GenSLMs: Genome-scale language models reveal SARS-CoV-2 evolutionary dynamics". The International Journal of High Performance Computing Applications. 37 (6): 683–705. doi:10.1177/10943420231201154. PMC 9709791. PMID 36451881.
- Johnson, Andrew E.; Renambot, Luc; Marai, G. Elisabeta; Tsoupikova, Daria; Papka, Michael E.; et al. (July 24, 2024). "Electronic Visualization Laboratory's 50th Anniversary Retrospective: Look to the Future, Build on the Past". PRESENCE: Virtual and Augmented Reality. 33: 77–127. doi:10.1162/pres_a_00421.
