= Bally Pin =

1979 video game

- Developer: Dave Nutting Associates
- Publisher: Bally Manufacturing Corporation
- Designer: Bob Ogdon
- Platform: Bally Astrocade
- Release: 1979
- Genre: Pinball
- Modes: Single-player, Multiplayer

Bally Pin is a pinball-based video game released in 1979 for the Bally Astrocade. It was programmed by Bob Ogdon with sound by Scot L. Norris.

== Gameplay ==
The game is played with two joysticks by up to four players. Each player is given 5 balls. Players earn points by using the flippers to hit the bumpers, drop targets, upper kicker targets, and spinner.

== Reception ==
The game was considered the best pinball simulation ever offered for any home gaming system at the time. Electronic Games magazine called the game skillfully constructed with realistic play and vivid colors.
