= Electronic Visualization Laboratory =

American research laboratory

The Electronic Visualization Laboratory (EVL) is an interdisciplinary research laboratory at the University of Illinois at Chicago College of Engineering’s computer science department. EVL specializes in collaborative visualization, virtual reality, visual data science, advanced computing and networking infrastructure, and artificial intelligence (AI). EVL enables scientists and engineers to manage the scale and complexity of their data uniquely, create information visualizations of multidimensional and multivariate data, explore 3D immersive worlds, juxtapose related yet heterogeneous 2D and 3D datasets, access computer infrastructure for machine learning, and move large datasets over high-speed networks.

== History ==
EVL was founded in 1973 by Tom DeFanti and Dan Sandin. The lab was initially called the Circle Graphics Habitat, a reference to the then-name of UIC, the University of Illinois at Chicago Circle (UICC). In 1982, following the decision to rename the university to University of Illinois Chicago (UIC), the Circle Graphics Habitat became the Electronic Visualization Laboratory. In 1973, DeFanti, who had recently graduated from Ohio State University with a PhD in CS, was first hired by the UIC Chemistry department to develop computer-generated instructional techniques. Chemistry owned a Vector General display with analog input devices and a PDP 11/45 computer, similar to what DeFanti used as a graduate student at OSU to develop his Graphics Symbiosis System (GRASS) computer graphics language. Just before arriving in Chicago, DeFanti met Dan Sandin, who taught at UIC’s School of Art & Design. They soon connected the Chemistry department’s PDP-11/Vector General Display running GRASS to the Sandin Image Processor (IP), enabling them to create real-time imagery on a monitor, manipulate it with an array of knobs and sliders, and then colorize it in real time to create artistic effects that were captured on video.

== Research ==
Tom DeFanti demoing early EVL work

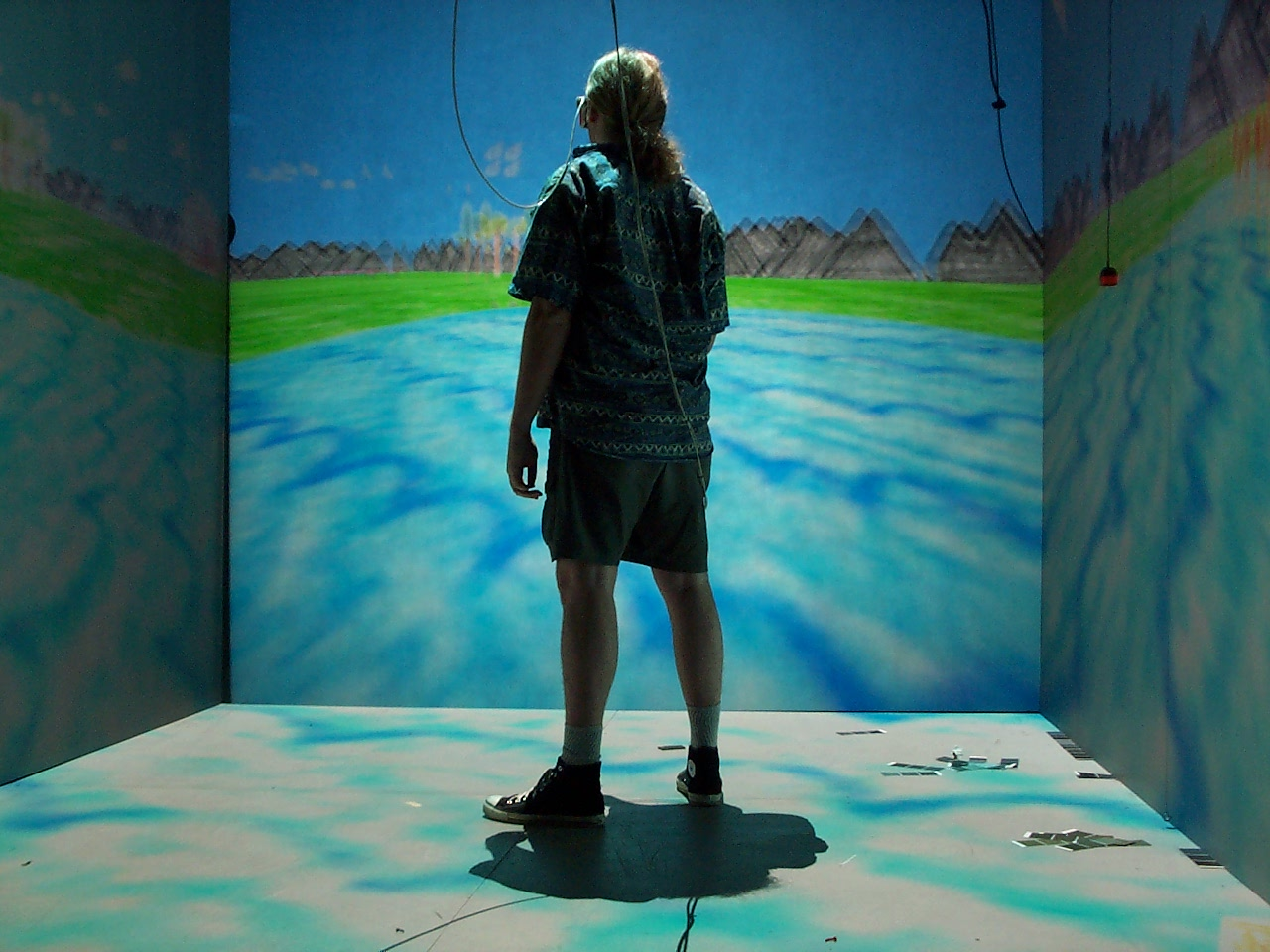
The CAVE

- 1976: EVL hosted artist Larry Cuba, who used the GRASS language to create the briefing room scene for the 1977 film, Star Wars: Episode IV – A New Hope.
- 1977: EVL developed the first dataglove, an inexpensive, lightweight user-interaction device to monitor hand movements as input to their analog system, mimicking a set of sliders. Known as the Sayre Glove, based on an idea from Rich Sayre, it used flexible tubes rather than fiber optics, with a light source at one end and a photocell at the other.
- 1981: The Z Box hardware and ZGRASS software (based on DeFanti's prior GRASS programming language), an early graphics system for the Bally home computer. This system featured NTSC video output and was used by a number of computer graphics artists of the time.
- 1984: Chicago-based (art)^{n}, pioneers of a photographic method to produce PHSColograms, an autostereoscopic — high-resolution autostereographic images displayed in lightboxes — began collaborating with EVL to reimagine them digitally.
- 1987: EVL produced The Interactive Image exhibition at the Museum of Science and Industry (Chicago) using Datamax UV-1 systems. The Interactive Image featured 12 real-time, interactive applications with user input controls that enabled museum visitors to explore mathematics and fractals, create animations, and produce personal artworks by image processing their video-captured faces.
- 1992: EVL introduced CAVE Automatic Virtual Environment, a multi-person, room-sized, walk-in, projection-based, high-resolution virtual reality (VR) system at the 1992 SIGGRAPH conference.
- 1995: The I-WAY event at Supercomputing '95, a prototype of grid computing.
- 1997: The STAR TAP project, a linking up of several international high-performance networks. Followed by the StarLight optical networking facility.
- 2004: EVL began developing SAGE (Scalable Adaptive Graphics Environment).
- 2008: EVL completed Cyber-Commons, a large classroom featuring a tiled display wall with a touch overlay.
- 2012: EVL introduces CAVE 2, a 22-foot diameter and circular (320-degree) virtual reality (VR) environment. CAVE 2 initially featured 72 passive stereo displays (18 columns × 4 rows), driven by a 36-node computer cluster.
- 2013: SpiderSense, a pioneer project in the field of human augmentics. SpiderSense is a wearable device that integrates ultrasound technology with vibrating hardware, allowing users to have directional awareness and "sense" obstacles in the environment without physically seeing the obstacles.

== Art ==
Through a collaboration between UIC’s Computer Science (CS) department and the School of Art & Design, students at EVL participated in the first interdisciplinary art and science program in the United States. Beginning in 1981, students in this program could pursue an MFA in Electronic Visualization or a MS/PhD in CS with a specialization in visualization. The joint degree program ended in 2013 when the College of Architecture, Design, and the Arts reorganized. However, EVL continues its strong working relationship with the School of Design. UIC became the first public university in the United States to offer a Computer Science + Design (CS + DES) undergraduate degree program leading to a joint BS; the interdisciplinary program is based at EVL.

Highlights of the electronic art work done at EVL include:

- Electronic Visualization Events (EVE) in the mid 1970s – live, real-time performances featuring computer graphics, video processing, and music.
- Early computer graphics art videos, created by combining DeFanti's GRASS system on a PDP-11 and the Sandin Image Processor. The video Spiral PTL (1980) was included in the inaugural collection of video art at the Museum of Modern Art.
- Computer artist Larry Cuba spent time at EVL, using the tools there for his films 3/78 and Calculated Movements, as well as a short special effects sequence for Star Wars.
- In 1996, EVL installed the first publicly accessible CAVE at the Ars Electronica Center in Austria, and presented a number of virtual reality artworks.
- EVL was featured in the Chicago New Media 1973–1992 exhibition centering the artwork that was created with the EVL and a demonstration of CAVE 2 was held during the time of the exhibition. The exhibition was held at UIC's gallery 400, and curated by Jon Cates.

== Leadership ==
- Thomas A. DeFanti and Daniel J. Sandin: Founding Directors, 1973–2004
- Jason Leigh: 2004–2014
- Maxine D. Brown: 2014–2020
- Andy Johnson: Interim Director, 2020–2024
- Michael E. Papka: 2024–

== SIGGRAPH ==
The members of EVL have been involved with the SIGGRAPH organization and conference ever since its inception. DeFanti has served as Secretary (1977–1981) and Chair (1981–1985) of the organization, and 1979 conference chair. Brown has served as Vice Chair for Operations (1985–1987) and Secretary (1981–1985), and chaired the 1992 conference. According to Jim Blinn, the popular Electronic Theatre "started out as a bunch of people crowding into Dan Sandin’s dorm room to watch videotapes." In 1979, DeFanti established the SIGGRAPH Video Review, which has been edited and administered by EVLer Dana Plepys since the mid '80s to present. At SIGGRAPH '92, EVL organized the "Showcase" event, where researchers demonstrated 35 projects in state-of-the-art computational science and scientific visualization. At SIGGRAPH '94, EVL organized the VROOM event, demonstrations of the state of virtual reality technology.

In 1998, Brown received the first ever SIGGRAPH Outstanding Service Award for her contributions to the organization. In 2000, DeFanti and EVL alumna Copper Giloth also received the Outstanding Service Award.
