= Larry Cuba =

Larry Cuba (born 1950) is a computer-animation artist who became active in the late 1970s and early 1980s.

Born in 1950 in Atlanta, Georgia, he received A.B. from Washington University in St. Louis in 1972 and his Master's Degree from California Institute of the Arts which includes parallel schools of Dance, Music, Film, Theater, Fine Arts, and Writing. The Cal Arts faculty included abstract animator Jules Engel, Expanded Cinema critic Gene Youngblood, and special effects artist Pat O'Neill.

In 1975, John Whitney Sr. invited Cuba to be the programmer on one of his films. The result of this collaboration was Arabesque. Subsequently, Cuba produced three more computer-animated films: 3/78 (Objects and Transformations), Two Space, and Calculated Movements. Cuba also provided computer graphics for Star Wars Episode IV: A New Hope in 1977. His animation of the Death Star is shown to pilots in the Rebel Alliance.

Cuba received grants for his work from the American Film Institute and The National Endowment for the Arts and was awarded a residency at the Center for Art and Media Technology Karlsruhe (ZKM). He has served on the juries for the Siggraph Electronic Theater, the Montpellier Festival of Abstract Film, The Ann Arbor Film Festival and Ars Electronica.

Cuba currently serves as the director of the iotaCenter in Los Angeles, California.

== Death Star sequence ==
Cuba used a Vector General 3D connected to a PDP-11/45 computer to make the computer animations shown during the briefing scene near the end of the film Star Wars.

George Lucas wanted to use computer animation to show the Death Star blueprints during this scene. He asked Ben Burtt, the film's sound designer, to get bids on the project. Cuba won the contract after he showed Lucas footage from his 1974 short film First Fig and mentioned that he had recently worked with famed animator John Whitney Sr.

Cuba produced the sequences using the GRASS programming language at the University of Illinois, Chicago's Circle Graphics Habitat. There are two main sequences in the resulting animation. The first shows the Death Star as a whole, while the second shows a series of views of the flight down the equatorial trench. The final few seconds of the animation, showing the proton torpedo flying into the Death Star's reactor core, were drawn by hand to look similar to the computer footage and added six months later.

The first part of the animation, showing the exterior of the Death Star, was created programmatically. Working from an early matte painting, GRASS's internal system for creating arcs and circles was used to produce the drawing. The 3D terminal's own transformation system was then used to automatically zoom into the image and rotate it on the display. The image was copied to film frame-by-frame using a Mitchell Camera whose motor was stepped by wiring it to one of the terminal's register-controlled indicator lamps. The sequence was filmed by having the GRASS program send new values to the zoom and rotation hardware in the terminal, then setting the register value that would turn on the lamp, thereby taking one image. The entire system was covered by cloth to reduce stray light.

The second segment was much more difficult to produce. The physical model used during filming was constructed by making many copies of six key shapes and then arranging them in different ways to produce a more random-looking trench. The completed model was over 40 feet (12 m) long. Cuba had previously used the GRASS system to create a program that allowed freehand drawings to be digitized manually on the graphics tablet. For this project he modified the code so that every time a point was entered on the tablet it would ask for a Z value to be entered on the keyboard, thereby producing a 3D point set. This was used to digitize the six characteristic features visible in the matte paintings he had been provided. Using the GRASS system, these shapes were loaded and moved to produce sections of the U-shaped trench.

Since the VG3D terminal was not able to calculate perspective internally, the portions of the animation showing the view along the trench had to be rendered on the host computer and then composited into the resulting frame. Each frame took about two minutes to create on the PDP-11/45 host, which then triggered the camera as before. The animation as a whole was expected to take a total of 12 hours to render, but it invariably crashed after about 30 minutes. Eventually, they gave up late on Saturday before the film had to be delivered on Monday. Cuba turned down the air conditioning before going to sleep on a bed in the computer room. On a lark, he ran it one last time and then went to sleep. That time it managed to run through the night and completed successfully. It was later realized the air conditioning had been too high.

Of the two minutes of film produced on the system, about 40 seconds appear in the movie, back projected into the scene. As of 2017, the original system was still operational.

== Films ==
First Fig (1974) Created at the Jet Propulsion Laboratory using borrowed mainframe time.

Arabesque (1975) Collaborative project with John Whitney Sr.

3/78 (Objects and Transformations) (1978). 6 minutes. Created in Chicago with Tom DeFanti's Graphic Symbiosis System GRASS, consists of sixteen "objects", each composed of 100 points of light, some of them geometric shapes like circles and squares, others more organic shapes resembling gushes of water. Each object performs rhythmic choreography, programmed by Cuba to satisfy mathematic potentials. In 2018 it was displayed in Chicago New Media 1973-1992 exhibition.

Two Space (1979). 8 minutes. Full-screen image- patterns which parallel the layered continuities of classical gamelan music. Using a programming language called RAP at the Los Angeles firm Information International Inc. (III), Larry was able to systematically explore the classic 17 symmetry groups, a technique used by Islamic artists to create abstract temple decorations.

Calculated Movements (1985). 6 minutes. Cuba programmed solid areas and volumes instead of the vector dots of the previous two films. It also in four "colors": black, white, light grey and dark grey. In five episodes, he alternates single events involving ribbon-like figures following intricate trajectories, with more complex episodes consisting of up to 40 individual events that appear and disappear at irregular intervals. Electronic sound scores accompany.
