= Datamax UV-1 =

Datamax UV-1R, with the associated analog breakout box on top

The Datamax UV-1 is a pioneering computer designed by a group of computer graphics artists working at the University of Illinois Chicago, known as the Circle Graphics Habitat. It was primarily the brainchild of Tom DeFanti, who was trying to build a machine capable of running his GRASS programming language at a personal computer price point, a project they referred to as the Z-Box. As time went on the project evolved into a machine intended to be used to make high-quality color graphics for output to videotape, and later, as a titling system for use by cable television companies. It represents an early example of a dedicated graphics workstation.

DeFanti had been working at the Habitat for some time when, in 1977, he was introduced to Jeff Frederiksen, a chip designer working at Dave Nutting Associates. Nutting had been contracted by Midway, the video game division of Bally, to create a standardized graphics driver chip. They intended to use it in most of their future arcade games, as well as a console they were working on which would later turn into the Astrocade.

Midway was not immediately interested in the home computer market, but the Nutting people managed to convince management to get DeFanti to port GRASS3 to the platform under contract. The idea was to build an external box that would be used with the existing console to turn it into a "real" computer, a system known as the ZGRASS-100. A number of people at the Habitat, as well as some from Nutting, worked on the project, adding a keyboard, memory, and additional connectors. A separate display chip created text, which was then mixed with the output from the display chip for the screen. Also included would be a new version of GRASS3, known as Zgrass.

At about the same time, another version of the same basic parts was built as the UV-1. In this case the machine was built as an all-in-one box, including the small amount of additional hardware needed to support the high-resolution mode of the Nutting chipset, which supplied 320 x 204 resolution with up to 8 colors per line. This mode required 16 KB for the display buffer alone, so the machine included 32 KB RAM and a larger 16 KB ROM with additional Zgrass commands in it. To this basic system the Habitat added high quality video output circuitry and a floppy disk interface.

Bally's intents for the UV-1 are not entirely clear. The November 1980 Byte magazine contains an article by DeFanti (et al.) that seems to suggest that the ZGRASS-100 was already "dead", and that the UV-1 was intended to be used for high-quality video output. Ad copy from the same era suggests that Bally intended to sell the UV-1 as a home computer, competing directly with the Apple II and similar machines. This makes the ZGRASS-100 somewhat unnecessary, so whether or not Bally intended to offer both remains a mystery. Either way, in 1980 Bally decided to exit the industry altogether, dropping both Z-Box projects, and the Astrocade too.

The final version of the Z-Box was the only one to be produced, as the UV-1R. This version was mounted in a rack mount case (thus the R) with considerably more RAM and a 32 KB ROM which contained the parts of CP/M that were needed to boot the machine, so a disk was no longer required. Much of the additional RAM, up to 256 KB of it, was dedicated as a RAM disk so the machines could be installed and left running for years – a floppy disk would burn out very quickly in this role. The additional RAM was not normally visible to the Z80 or the display hardware, but a new memory controller could switch in blocks of it so a number of screens could be cached if the disk needs were not that large.

Although Midway had already given up on the Astrocade, they later sold the rights to the design to a 3rd party, Astrovision. Some time in the mid-1980s Astrovision decided to release the original "add-under" version of the hardware, now known as the ZGRASS-32. It is unclear if any were sold.
