= Copper Giloth =

New media artist

Copper Giloth is a new media artist based in Amherst, Massachusetts. Giloth's work involves digital media, mobile art, virtual environments, animations, videos, painting, and installations, and have been influenced by elements of her life such as her parents. She, along with Darcy Gerbarg, helped organize art exhibitions that showed alongside the SIGGRAPH conference, marking the exhibitions as the first to be shown at the conference. Giloth has been described as "one of the leading exponents of computer art".

Her work has been covered by outlets such as USA Today and the Chicago Tribune. Giloth's work was displayed in a 1980 exhibition at the Museum of Contemporary Art, Chicago, as well as in a 1982 exhibition 'Art and Technology: Chicago Video at MoMA' at the Museum of Modern Art.

Giloth is currently working as an associate professor of art at the University of Massachusetts Amherst, where she teaches courses in Digital Media, Information Design, Mobile Apps and Drawing.

== Education and early work ==
Giloth graduated from the University of Illinois in 1980, with a MFA in Electronic Visualization. She was the first person to graduate from this program.

Following graduation, Giloth began working with computers as her primary medium. This included the creation of ACM Siggraph Art Show competitions. The 1983 edition was on display throughout the U.S., Canada, France, and Japan.

In 1985, Giloth joined the faculty of University of Massachusetts Amherst.

== Recent work ==
=== Teapots and Computer Graphics (2006) ===
This series incorporates the yearly addition of words into the English dictionary, using terms related to "teapots" and "computer graphics" as a reference point. Giloth created drawings that observe the vast difference in language development between the two. Through her research, Giloth found 231 words in relation to "teapots", a term whose history can be traced back to the 15th century, and 1243 words in relation to "computer graphics", a term that only came into existence around the 1950s. She used these words in her work to consider the patterns shared between the two terms.

=== Dimanche Matin aux Portes d'Hotel de Ville (2006-2011) ===
Giloth printed lightjet documentation of Hotel de Ville figures that are in rotation with the changing seasons.

=== BioGrids (2011) ===
In 2011, Giloth created a series of prints inspired by her family history. These BioGrids were based on the mother-daughter relationship. Inspired by her family's quilts and drawings made by her mother, Giloth used digital images in related to ideas of evolution and genealogy to create these prints.

These archival pigment prints measure 40x40”, and were printed on Museo Fine Art Rag Paper.

== Select works ==
=== Books ===
- Come In/Keep Out: The Complete Driveway (2000, work in progress)

=== Installations ===
- Narrative Information (1987)
- Landscape (1990/1993)*

=== Video works ===
- Robert Mallary: Pioneer In Computer Art (1992)
- Modelling the Female Body: A Survey of Computer Generated Women (1994)

=== Other work ===
- Fragments of War (1993)
- 3rd Person Interactive (1997)
- “Labyrinth-of-Fables” (2014)
- BioGrids (2011)
- Teapots and Computer Graphics (2006)

== Select exhibitions ==
- Chicago New Media 1973-1992, Gallery 400, Chicago, Il. (2018)
- From Video Games to Video Art (1980, exhibited at "Video Art: The Electronic Medium," at the Museum of Contemporary Art, Chicago)
- Birdwatching By Computer (1984, exhibited at the New York Academy of Sciences, NYC)
- The video "Skippy peanut butter jar" Exhibited at "ART AND TECHNOLOGY: "CHICAGO VIDEO" AT MoMA" at MoMA
