= Daniel J. Sandin =

American artist and researcher

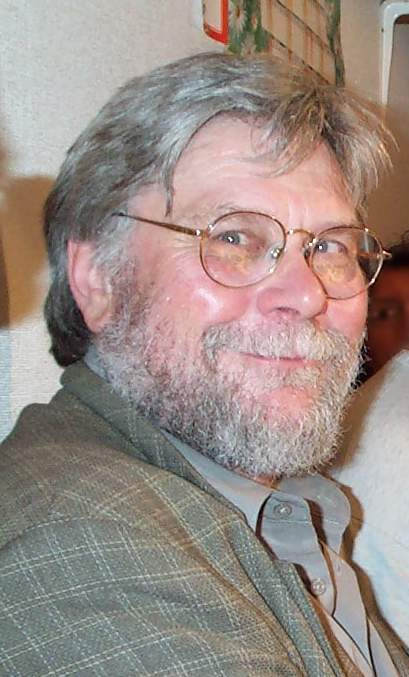
Dan Sandin

Daniel J. Sandin (born 1942) is an American video and computer graphics artist, designer and researcher. He is a Professor Emeritus of the School of Art & Design at University of Illinois at Chicago, and co-director of the Electronic Visualization Laboratory (EVL) at the University of Illinois at Chicago. He is an internationally recognized pioneer in computer graphics, electronic art and visualization.

== Biography ==
Dan Sandin received his B.A. in Natural Sciences from Shimer College in 1964 and his M.S. in Physics from the University of Wisconsin–Madison in 1967. He became interested in video in 1967, while helping to organize student demonstrations at the University of Illinois. In 1969, he joined as a teacher at the University of Illinois at Chicago (UIC), in order to bring technology into the arts program. This was shortly after his presentation of "Glowflow", a computer controlled light and sound system, created with Myron Krueger, Jerry Erdman, and Richard Venezky. By 1972, Thomas A. DeFanti joined UIC and together with Sandin they founded the Circle Graphics Habitat, now known as the Electronic Visualization Laboratory (EVL).

In 2018 Sandin's work, the Sandin Image Processor and the Sayre Glove, was included in the Chicago New Media 1973-1992 exhibition, curated by jonCates. He also gave a demonstration of Particle Dreams in Spherical Harmonics in the CAVE 2 system, and was part of the symposium both of which were connected to the exhibition as a series of events.

His major achievements were working on a series of projects including: Glowflow (1969), Sandin Image Processor (IP) (1971–1973), Sayre Glove (1977), PHSColograms (1988), CAVE (1992) and ImmersaDesk and Infinity Wall.

=== Awards ===
Dan Sandin received several awards including: the Guggenheim Fellowships awarded for video and sound in 1978, the National Endowment for the Arts (NEA) for video art (with Stevenson Palfi) in 1981, the Rockefeller Foundation's Video Fellowship in 1981, the Inventor of the Year award from the University of Illinois in 2000, and the Rockefeller Foundation's Film, Video and Multimedia Fellowship in 2002 for "Looking for Water 2," a virtual-reality, 3-D installation.

== Work ==
Dan Sandin has said that his career has three main objectives:

- the design of electronic instruments and computer programs for visual performance and personal growth;
- the development of educational facilities and programs related to the use of electronic screens; and
- the production and exhibition of computer processed visual works for personal expressive reasons.

=== Sandin Image Processor ===
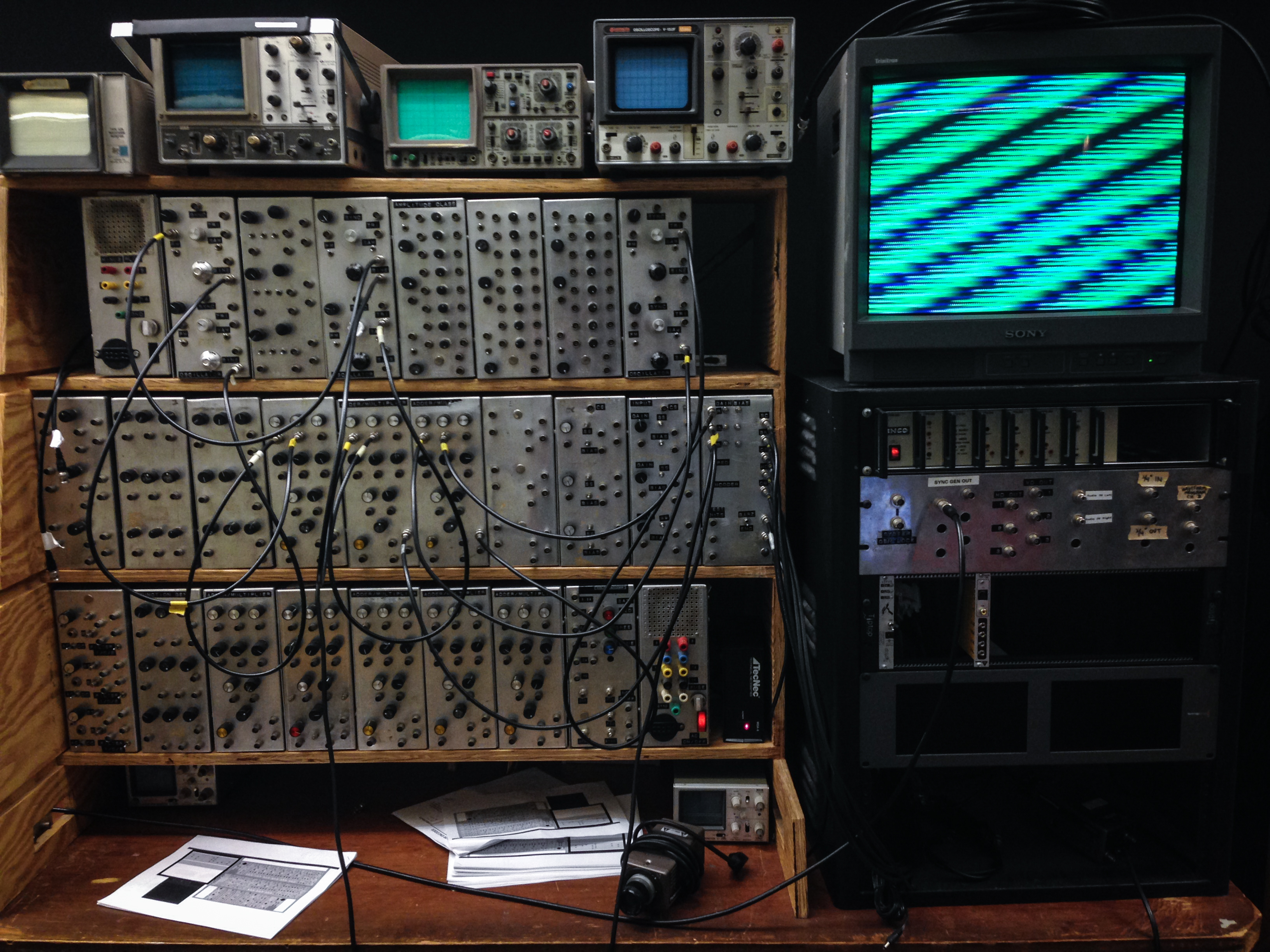
Sandin Image Processor, exhibited at School of the Art Institute of Chicago (SAIC)

From 1971 to 1973, he designed the Sandin Image Processor, a patch programmable analog computer for real-time manipulation of video inputs through the control of the grey level information. His friend and neighbor Phil Morton helped with the early schematic plans diagram which they shared in a manual called the Distribution Religion. Sandin demoed his Image Processor in a recorded live video “5 Minute Romp Through the IP” (1973). This modular design was based on the Moog synthesizer. With Tom DeFanti, he would combine it with real-time computer graphics and synthesized music and perform visual concerts. He has performed worldwide and has received grants in support of his work from the Rockefeller Foundation (1981), the National Science Foundation, the National Endowment for the Arts (1980) and the Guggenheim Foundation (1978). His piece "Spiral PTL" was one of the first pieces included in the Museum of Modern Art's video art collection.

=== The Sayre Glove ===
In 1977, with Tom DeFanti and Rich Sayre, he designed the Sayre Glove, the first data glove, as part of a grant from the National Endowment for the Arts. This device used light based sensors with flexible tubes with a light source at one end and a photocell at the other. As the fingers were bent, the amount of light that hit the photocells varied, thus providing a measure of finger flexion. It was mainly used to manipulate sliders, but was lightweight and inexpensive.

=== PHSColograms ===
By 1988, Sandin was working on a type of digital photography called PHSColograms; a system whereby a number of still images were situated in an autostereoscopic manner and back-projected with light. The effect was very similar to holograms and many times viewers would mistake them as such. The initial system supported roughly 13 images but further improvements now could easily allow 100 such images to be used. This system was designed primarily for use in the medical field where these quasi-3D images could benefit surgeons.

=== Cave Automatic Virtual Environment ===
A group of people viewing Sandin's From Death's Door to the Garden Peninsula in the CAVE at Ars Electronica '99

The first CAVE was invented by Carolina Cruz-Neira, Daniel J. Sandin, and Thomas A. DeFanti in 1992. This is an immersive system that became the standard for rear projection-based virtual reality systems. The normal full system consists of projections screens along the front, side and floor axes, and a tracking system for the "user". Although they used the recursive acronym Cave Automatic Virtual Environment for the CAVE system, the name also refers to Plato's "Republic" and "The Allegory of the Cave" where he explored the concepts of reality and human perception.

Since then there have been a couple offshoots of the CAVE technology, including ImmersaDesk, Infinity Wall and Oblong Industries' G-speak system. The ImmersaDesk is a semi-immersive system, resembling a drafting table, while the Infinity Wall is designed to cater to an entire room of people, such as a conference room. Extending this concept, G-speak supports gestural input from multiple-users and multiple-devices on and expandable array of monitors.

== Works ==
Year	Title	Genre	Role	Notes
1973	"5 Minute Romp through the Image Processor"			with Phil Morton
1975	"Wandawega Waters"	Experimental film with computer graphics		An experimental piece using computer processed video to give the surroundings of Lake Wandawega an other-worldly appearance.
1974	"Poop for the NCC"			with Thomas A. DeFanti
1974	"Triangle in Front of Square in Front of Circle in Front of Triangle"			
1979	"Christmas Morning in Sister Bay"	Flm with computer graphics	Producer	experimental video featuring sounds of waves and church bells playing Christmas carols, while computer processed video pans across the beach of Sister Bay.
1980	"Spiral PTL"	Experimental film with computer graphics	Video synthesis	"Probably The Last" with Thomas A. DeFanti (computer graphics) and Mimi Shevitz (audio synthesis), in the collection of the Museum of Modern Art (MoMA) in New York City. Short film features a computer processed image of a spiral transforming shape/form, set to new age music.
1980	"Spiral for A.C.M."			Computer animation creates different spirals and effects.
1990	"A Volume of Two-Dimensional Julia Sets"			
1995	"The Kinetic Sculpture Garden"			
1996	"The Oort Continuum"	VR application for the CAVE		The developers of the app include Alan Cruz, Alan Millman, Daniel J. Sandin, Deb Lowman, Ka-Leung Jark, Marcus Thiebaux, Margaret Dolinsky, Milana Huang, Tom Coffin, Margaret Watson, Joe Insley, Bor Tyng Lin, Robert Grzeszczuk, Lou Kauffman, Gary Minnix. Featured in ACM Siggraph 1996 festival, Ars Electronica Center, and Total Museum Conference.
1997	"Poverty Island With Video Skies"			An integration of video images into a virtual environment. Featured in ACM Siggraph 1998 festival.
1999	"From Death's Door to the Garden Peninsula"			
2001	"EVL: Alive on the Grid"			
