= Sandin Image Processor =

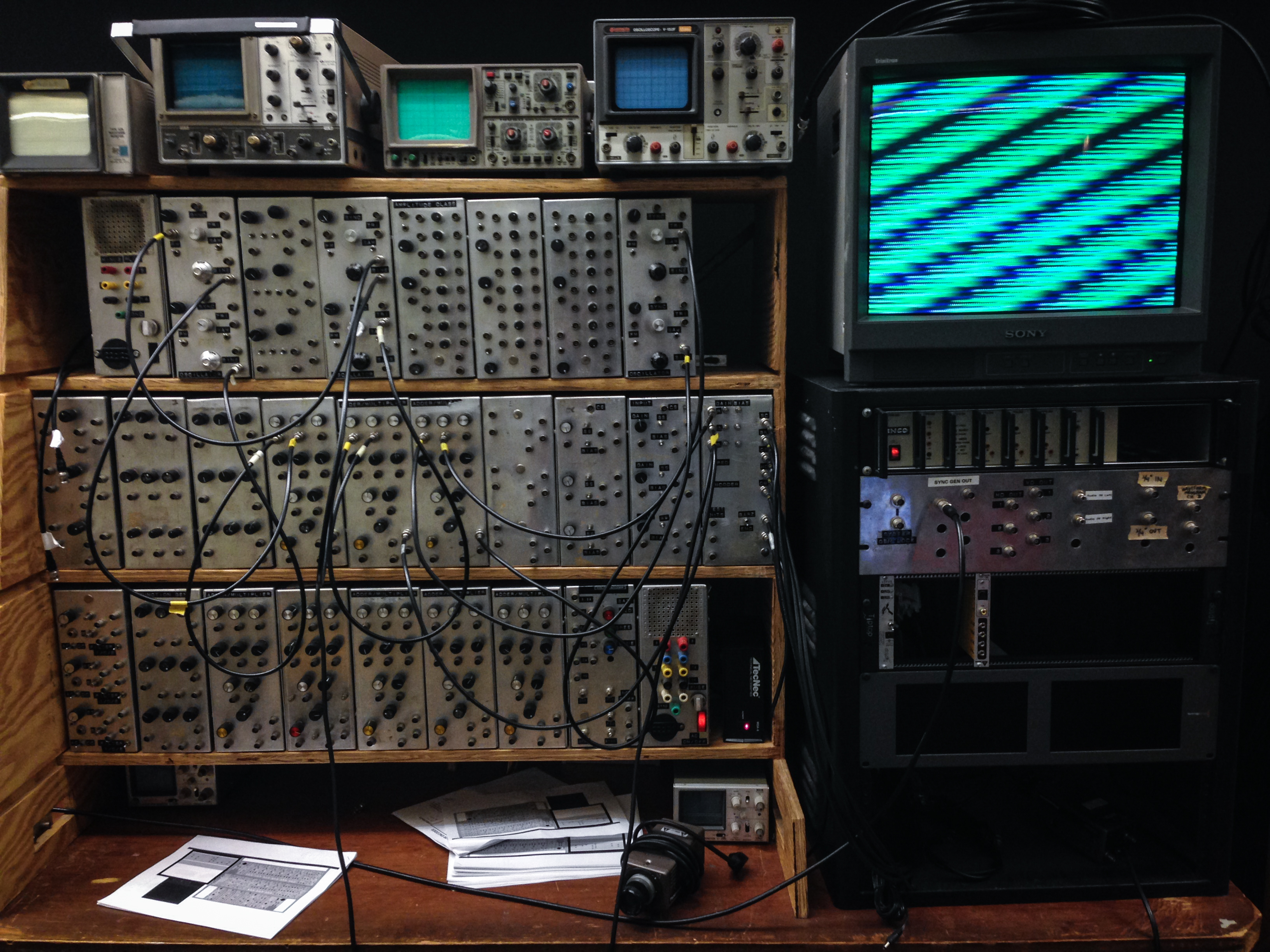
Sandin Image Processor, exhibited at School of the Art Institute of Chicago (SAIC)

The Sandin Image Processor is a video synthesizer, usually introduced as invented by Dan Sandin and designed between 1971 and 1974. Some called it the "video equivalent of a Moog audio synthesizer." It accepted basic video signals and mixed and modified them in a fashion similar to what a Moog synthesizer did with audio. An analog, Modular Synthesizer, real time, video processing instrument, it provided video processing performance and produced subtle and delicate video effects of a complexity not seen again until well into the digital video revolution.

Its real time nature led to its use in live theater performance, including "Electronic Visualization Events" where it was seen processing the output of Tom DeFanti's Graphics Symbiosis System. The Sandin Image Processor fostered many imaginative videotapes seen, for example at early SIGGRAPH conferences. Sandin's instrument, and his personally delivered instruction in video, trained many of the people who were later to engineer the digital video revolution.

Physically, an Image Processor system would be built out of modules. Several types of modules were defined and typically would be an aluminum box containing a circuit board inside, video connectors and knobs on front of box and power connector on back of box. The modules would be organized in rows. Individual systems could vary in size and increase in power with the addition of more modules. Typical modules would be signal sources, combiners and modifiers, effects modules, sync, color encoder, color decoder, and NTSC video interface.

Sandin was an advocate of education and a "copy it right distribution religion". Accordingly, he placed the circuit board layouts with a commercial circuit board company where anyone could buy them for ordinary manufacturing costs and freely published schematics and other documentation. A following of video artists, students, and others interested in video electronics would assemble these modules kit style and try to build up their synthesizers. From time to time Sandin and staff would hold fix-it parties where modules that failed to come up for non-electronics oriented artists would be repaired by the senior staff. This distribution method was unique in the proprietary and competitive industrial field of advanced electronics.

Other analog video instruments from the same era include the Paik-Abe video synthesizer, the Rutt/Etra Video Synthesizer (by Steve Rutt and Bill Etra), and the work of Steina and Woody Vasulka with Jeff Schier and Diana Dosch.

== Module types ==
- Oscillator
- Camera Input
- Adder Multiplier
- Comparator
- Differentiator ( Edge Emphasizer )
- Amplitude Classifier
- Function Generator
- Color Encoder
