= Thomas A. DeFanti =

American computer graphics researcher

Thomas Albert "Tom" DeFanti (born September 18, 1948) is an American computer graphics researcher and pioneer. His work has ranged from early computer animation, to scientific visualization, virtual reality, and grid computing. He is a distinguished professor of Computer Science at the University of Illinois at Chicago, and a research scientist at the California Institute for Telecommunications and Information Technology (Calit2).

== Education and early life ==
Born September 18, 1948, in Queens, New York City, New York and attended Stuyvesant High School. In 1969, DeFanti received a B.A. in Mathematics from Queens College, and in 1970 he received a M.S. in Computer Information Science from Ohio State University. In 1973 he received a Ph.D. in Computer Information Science from Ohio State University, studying under Charles Csuri in the Computer Graphics Research Group. For his dissertation, he created the GRASS programming language, a three-dimensional, real-time animation system usable by computer novices.

== Work ==
In 1973, he joined the faculty of the University of Illinois at Chicago (UIC) and with Daniel J. Sandin, he founded the Circle Graphics Habitat, now known as the Electronic Visualization Laboratory (EVL).

At UIC, DeFanti further developed the GRASS language, and later created an improved version, ZGRASS, implemented on the low-cost Datamax UV-1. The GRASS and ZGRASS languages have been used by a number of computer artists, including Larry Cuba, in his film 3/78 and the animated Death Star sequence for Star Wars, created within the EVL. Later significant work done at EVL includes development of the graphics system for the Bally Technologies home computer, invention of the first data glove, co-editing the 1987 NSF-sponsored report Visualization in Scientific Computing that outlined the emerging discipline of scientific visualization, invention of PHSColograms, and invention of the CAVE Automatic Virtual Environment. DeFanti's current work includes heading the TransLight/StarLight international multi-gigabit networking project and co-directing the OptIPuter optical networking and visualization project.

DeFanti contributed greatly to the growth of the SIGGRAPH organization and conference. He co-organized early film and video presentations (which became the Electronic Theatre) beginning in 1973, started the SIGGRAPH Video Review archive of computer graphics research in 1979, and served as chair of the group from 1981 to 1985.

DeFanti is a Fellow of the Association for Computing Machinery. He has received the 1988 ACM Outstanding Contribution Award, the 2000 SIGGRAPH Outstanding Service Award, and the UIC Inventor of the Year Award.

In 2018 DeFanti's work and contribution were included in the Chicago New Media 1973-1992 exhibition, curated by jonCates.

== Publications ==
=== Select books ===
- Brown, Maxine; McCormick, Bruce H.; DeFanti, Thomas A. (1987), Visualization in Scientific Computing (PDF), ACM (published July 1987)

=== Select articles and papers ===
- DeFanti, T. A.; Sandin, D. J.; Ainsworth, R. A. (1976). "Control structures for performance graphics". The papers of the ACM symposium on Graphic languages. ACM. pp. 79–84.
- DeFanti, T. (June 1976). "The Digital Component of the Circle Graphics Habitat". AFIPS '76: Proceedings of the national computer conference and exposition. pp. 195–203.
- Campbell, Graham; DeFanti, Thomas A.; Frederiksen, Jeff; Joyce, Stephen A.; Leske, Lawrence A. (August 1986). "Two bit/pixel full color encoding". SIGGRAPH '86: Proceedings of the 13th annual conference on Computer graphics and interactive techniques. ACM. pp. 215–223.
- DeFanti, Thomas A.; Brown, Maxine D.; McCormick, Bruce H. (August 1989). "Visualization: Expanding Scientific and Engineering Research Opportunities". Computer. 22 (8). IEEE: 12–25. doi:10.1109/2.35195. S2CID 17357523.
- Hart, John C.; DeFanti, Thomas A. (July 1991). "Efficient antialiased rendering of 3-D linear fractals". SIGGRAPH '91: Proceedings of the 18th annual conference on Computer graphics and interactive techniques. ACM. pp. 91–1008.
- Cruz-Neira, Caroline; Sandin, Daniel; DeFanti, Thomas; R.V. Kenyon and J.C. Hart, "The CAVE: Audio Visual Experience Automatic Virtual Environment," Communications of the ACM, Vol. 35, No. 6, pp. 65–72, June, 1992.
- DeFanti, Thomas A.; Sandin, Daniel J.; Cruz-Neira, Carolina (October 1993). "A 'Room' with a 'View'". IEEE Spectrum. 30 (10). IEEE: 30–33, 39. doi:10.1109/6.237582. S2CID 40023851.
- DeFanti, Tom; Stevens, Rick (1999), "Teleimmersion", in Foster, Ian; Kesselman, Carl (eds.), The Grid: Blueprint for a New Computing Infrastructure, Morgan Kaufmann, pp. 131–155, ISBN 978-1-55860-475-9
