= Climate change in China =

Emissions, impacts and responses of China related to climate change

Climate change is having major effects on the Chinese economy, society and the environment. The People's Republic of China is the world's largest emitter of carbon dioxide, through an energy infrastructure heavily focused on coal. China's per capita emissions are greater than the world and European Union averages but less than Australia, Canada, and the U.S. China recorded its hottest year on record in 2025, with an annual average temperature of 11.0 °C (51.8 °F). On the basis of cumulative CO_{2} emissions measured from 1751 through to 2017, China is responsible for 13% of global and about half of the United States' cumulative emissions. According to the Carbon Majors Database, Chinese state coal production alone accounts for 14% of historical global emissions.

A burgeoning construction industry and industrial manufacturing contribute heavily to carbon emissions. It has also been noted that higher-income countries have outsourced emissions-intensive industries to China.

China is suffering from the negative effects of global warming in agriculture, forestry and water resources, and is expected to continue to see increased impacts. China's government is taking some measures to increase renewable energy, and other decarbonization efforts, vowing to hit peak emissions before 2030 and be carbon neutral by 2060 by adopting "more vigorous policies and measures." In 2022, China's GHG emissions were expected to peak in 2025 and return to 2022 levels by 2030. However, such a pathway will still lead to a 3 degrees Celsius temperature rise.

== Greenhouse gas emissions ==
China has the most total annual emissions (area of rectangle) of any nation, and has higher than average per capita emissions.

Cumulatively over time, China is the second-largest contributor nation to global economic damage from emissions, following the U.S.

The total greenhouse gas emissions of the People's Republic of China are the world's highest, accounting for 35% of the world's total, in 2023, according to the International Energy Agency. The country's emissions may have peaked in 2024 or 2025.

When measuring production-based emissions, China emitted over 12.6 gigatonnes (Gt) CO_{2}eq of greenhouse gases in 2023, 35% of the world's total. When measuring in consumption-based terms, which adds emissions associated with imported goods and extracts those associated with exported goods, China accounted for 13 gigatonnes (Gt) or 25% of global emissions in 2019.

== Impacts on the natural environment ==
The natural environment of China faces risks from climate change in the form of heat waves, more severe and frequent storms, droughts, floods, and sea level rise. The summer of 2022 saw a heat wave lasting more than nine weeks, flooding in the Pearl River Basin, and drought so severe that certain areas of the Yangtze river were lower than ever recorded before. Between 1980 and 2012, sea levels off the coast of eastern China rose 3.5 inches (9.3 centimeters).

=== Temperature and weather changes ===
Köppen climate classification map for China for 1980–2016

2071–2100 map under the most intense climate change scenario. Mid-range scenarios are currently considered more likely

There has also been an increased occurrence of climate-related disasters such as droughts and floods, and the impact is growing. These events have grave consequences for productivity when they occur, and also create serious repercussions for the natural environment and infrastructure. This threatens the lives of billions and aggravates poverty.

Since the 18th National Congress of the Chinese Communist Party (CCP) convened in 2012, China has prioritized its response to climate change.

A study published in 2017, using continuous and coherent severe weather reports from over 500 staffed stations from 1961 to 2010, found a significant decreasing trend in severe weather occurrence across China, with the total number of severe weather days that have either thunderstorms, hail and/or damaging wind decreasing about 50% from 1961 to 2010. The reduction in severe weather occurrences correlated strongly with the weakening of the East Asian summer monsoon.

China observed a ground average temperature increase of 0.24 °C (0.43 °F) per decade from 1951 to 2017, exceeding the global rate. The average precipitation of China was 641.3 millimetres (25.25 in) in 2017, 1.8% more than the average precipitation of previous years. There was an annual increase in concentrations of carbon dioxide from 1990 to 2016. The annual mean concentration of atmospheric carbon dioxide, methane, and nitrous oxide at Wanliguan Station were 404.4 ppm, 1907 ppb, and 329.7 ppb separately in 2016, slightly higher than the global mean concentration in 2016.

=== Sea level rise ===
The sea level rise was 3.5mm/year from 1980 to 2022 compared to the global average of 3.2mm/year.

China's first National Assessment of Global Climate Change, released in the 2000s by the Ministry of Science and Technology (MOST), states that China already suffers from the environmental impacts of climate change: increase of surface and ocean temperature, rise of sea level. Temperatures in the Tibetan Plateau of China are rising four times faster than anywhere else (data from 2011). Rising sea level is an alarming trend because China has a very long and densely populated coastline, with some of the most economically developed cities such as Shanghai, Tianjin, and Guangzhou situated there. Chinese research has estimated that a one-meter rise in sea level would inundate 92,000 square kilometers of China's coast, thereby displacing 67 million people.

Climate change caused an increase in sea level, threatening to impair the functions of harbors. Urban areas face compounding threats not only from rising sea levels but also from land subsidence. A Nature research paper suggests that global sea-level rise rates since 1900 are faster than in any century over at least the past four millennia, with human activities causing over 94% of observed urban subsidence in southeastern China, creating a compounding hazard for Chinese coastal cities.

Rising sea levels affect China's coastal land. Cities along the coast such as Shanghai, only 3–5 meters above sea level leaves its 18 million residents vulnerable. According to a 2004 study by the Hong Kong Observatory, sea levels in Victoria Harbor in Hong Kong rose .12 meters since 1954.

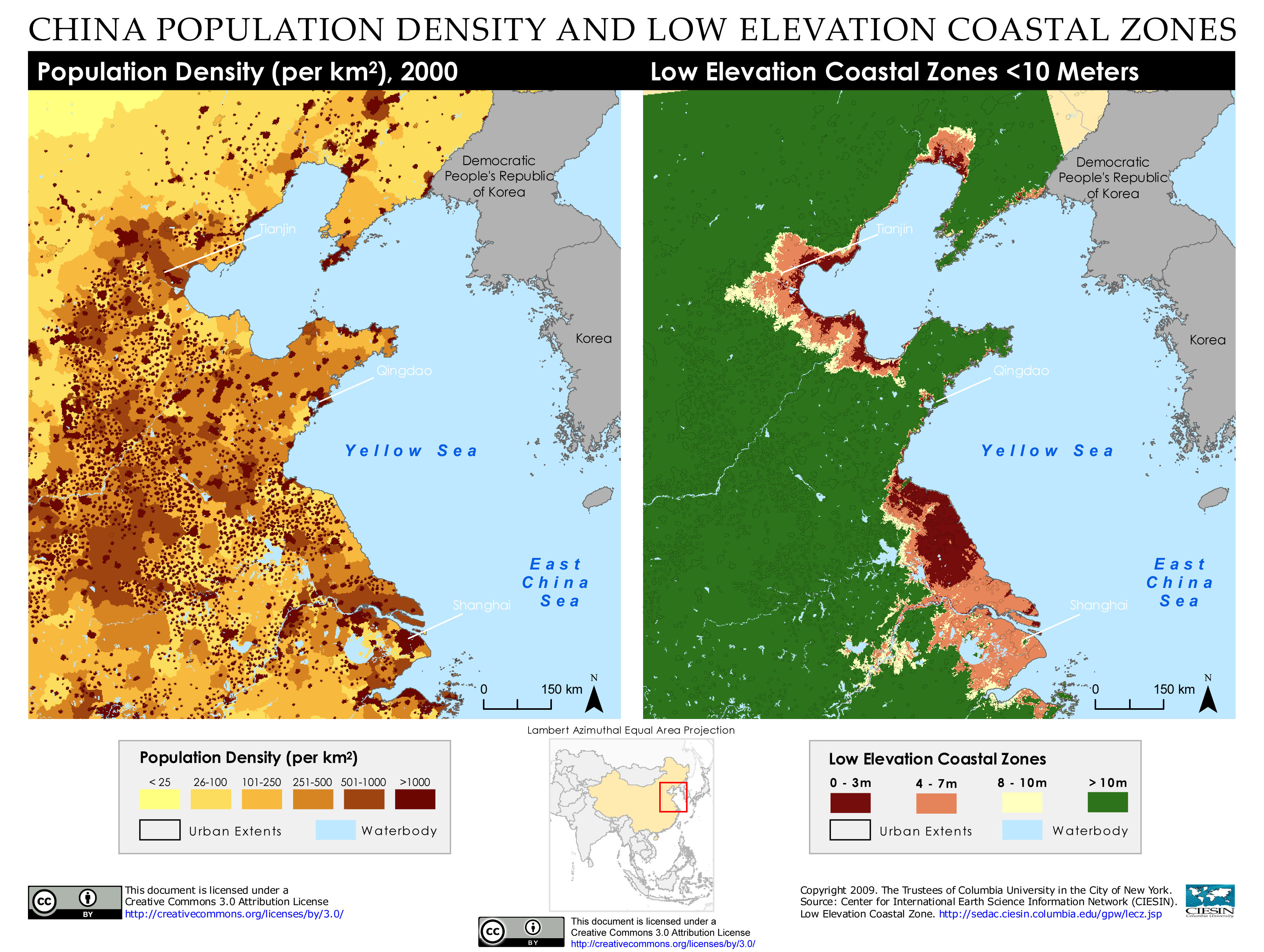
Yellow Sea

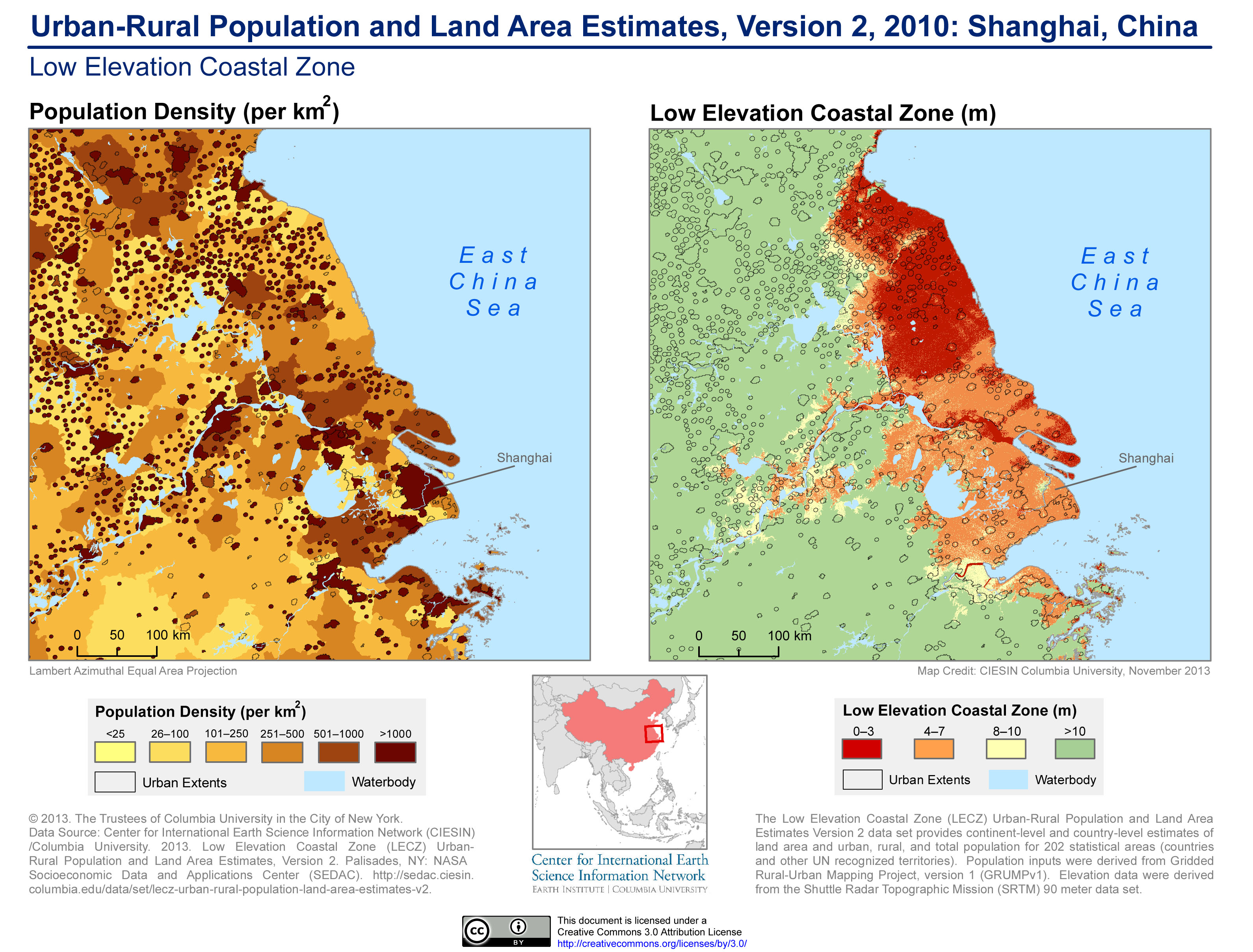
Shanghai

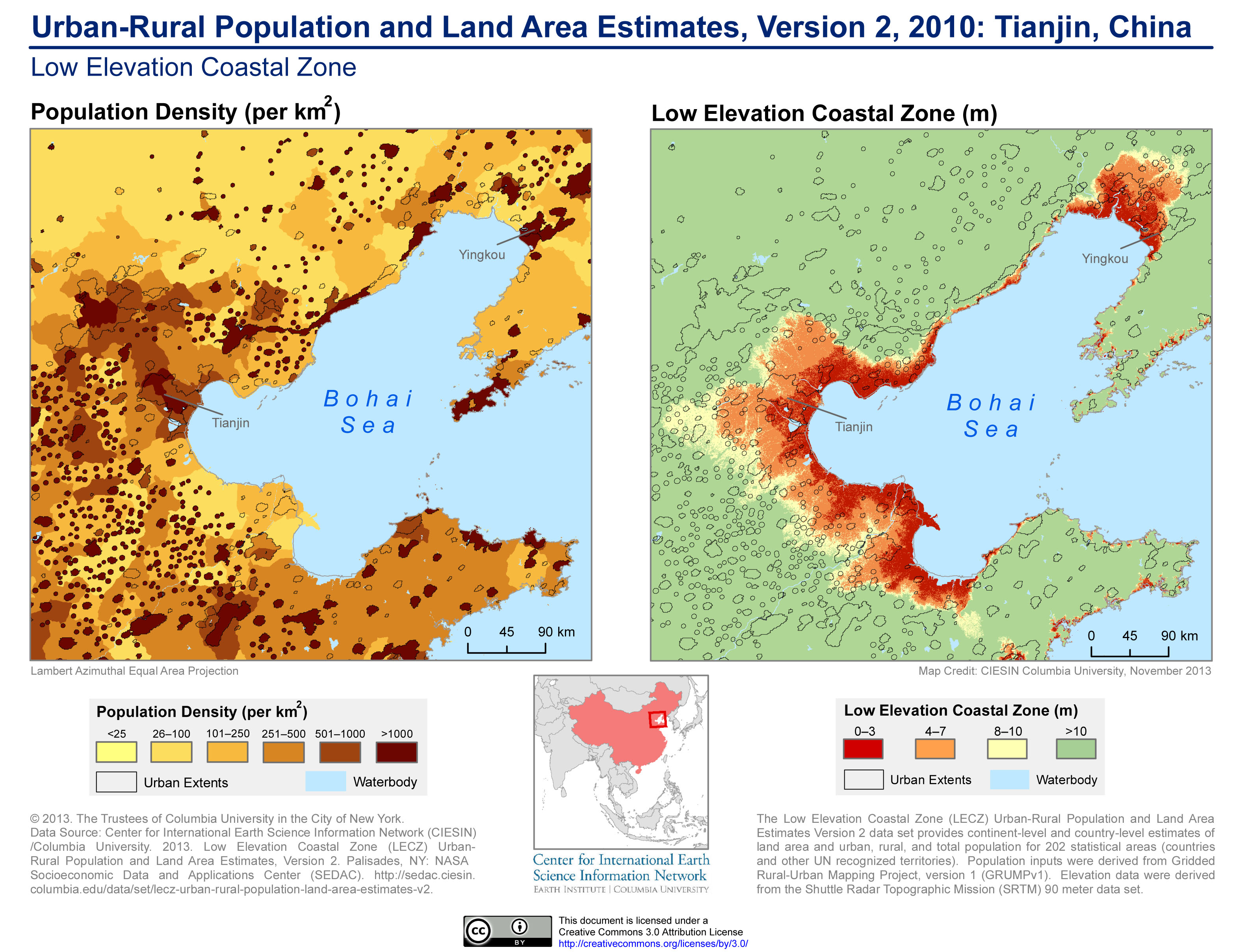
Tianjin and Yingkou

=== Ecosystems ===
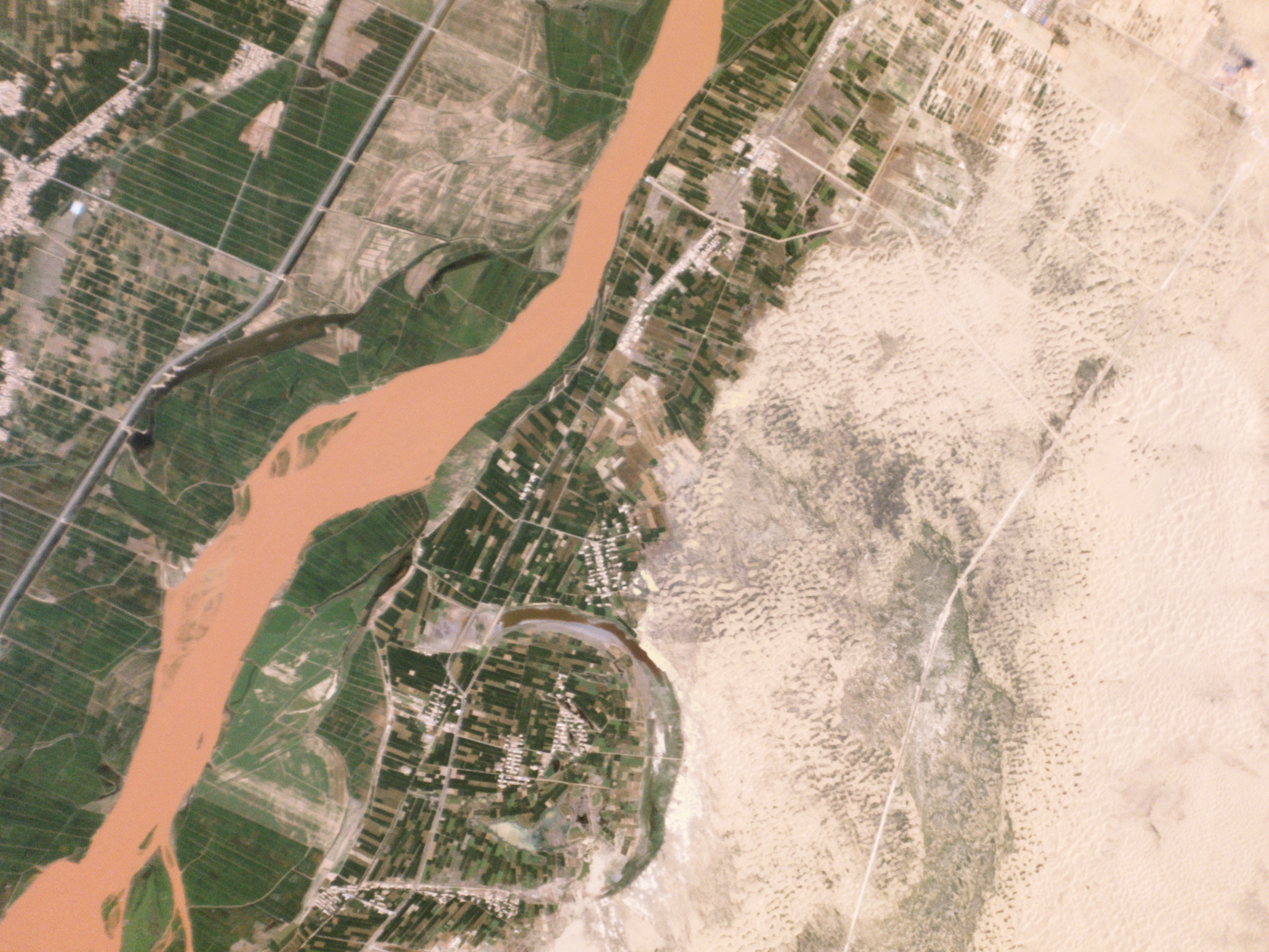
Desertification Control Project, Ningxia China

China is home to 17,300 species of plants and animals: 667 vertebrates, ancient flora and fauna. Due to rising temperatures, within the next century 20-30 percent of species will go extinct globally. As of 2011, about 35 percent of vertebrates and invertebrates, and between 70 and 90 percent of plants in China were endangered.

More than one fourth of China is covered by desert, which is growing due to desertification. Desertification in China destroys farmland, biodiversity, and exacerbates poverty.

As a result of climate change, ocean waters are becoming warmer and more acidic. This increases the vulnerability of coral in the South China Sea to other dangers like coral mining and over-fishing. This lowers biodiversity, and negatively affects the fish market economy in China.

=== Water resources ===
Climate change will worsen the already uneven distribution of water resources in China, causing both drought and flooding. Atmospheric circulation changes and rising temperatures make summer monsoons less likely to travel inland where the rain is needed. However, monsoons that do occur are expected to be more intense, resulting in large quantities of flood-causing rain.

August of 2025 saw more than 10 million people in China affected by flooding and drought. A 2001 drought resulted in the loss of approximately 6.4 billion U.S. dollars' worth of crops and reduced the water supply of 33 million rural people and 22 million livestock. Drought also effects availability of electricity from hydroelectric dams resulting in a continued reliance on coal-fired power plants.

Glacier melt in the Northern Region of China causes flooding in the upper Yangtze River, and a reduction of water volume in the lower parts of the river. From 1960 to 2025, seven thousand glaciers in China had melted entirely and the total glacier area was 26% lower. As glaciers melt, dams of ice form lakes. When these dams eventually collapse, the result is called a glacial lake outburst flood (GLOF). This type of flood is becoming more common as a result of climate change and causes large amounts of damage.

== Impacts on people ==
At least 72% of Chinese, American and European respondents to a 2020−2021 European Investment Bank climate survey stated that climate change had an impact on everyday life.

=== Health impacts ===
Climate change has a significant impact on the health of Chinese people. The high temperature has caused health risks for some groups of people, such as older people (≥65 years old), outdoor workers, or people living in poverty. In 2019, each person who is older than 65 years had to endure extra 13 days of the heatwave, and 26,800 people died because of the heatwave in 2019.

In the future, the probability rate of malaria transmission will increase 39-140 percent because of temperature increase of 1-2 degrees Celsius in south China.

=== Economic impacts ===
According to the IPCC Sixth Assessment Report the country that will pay the highest financial cost if the temperature continue to rise is China. The impacts will include food insecurity, water scarcity, flooding, especially in coastal areas where most of the population lives due to higher than average sea level rise, and more powerful cyclones. At some point part of the country can face wet-bulb temperatures higher than humans and other mammals can tolerate more than six hours.

==== Agriculture ====
In the years 1970-2016 the occurrence of crop pest and diseases increased 4 times. 22% of that rise are due to climate change. By the year 2100 the occurrence will rise 243% under a low emission scenario and by 460% under a high emissions scenario. China is the biggest producer of wheat and rice in the world. It is in the second place in maize production.The negative effects of climate change on China's agriculture have become increasingly evident. Climate change has increased the frequency and severity of heat stress and drought, contributing to greater variability in agricultural production and affecting crop yields and quality. Future climate change is projected to reduce the yields of major crops, including wheat, rice, and maize, and to alter the geographic distribution of agricultural production.

China is also facing agricultural challenges associated with the global demand for commodities such as soybeans. China's growing soybean imports have been linked to land-use change and environmental impacts in major producing countries, particularly in South America, illustrating the transnational environmental effects of agricultural commodity trade. Over the past 70 years, climate change seriously reduced China's food security. Although rising annual temperatures can accelerate crop growth and potentially increase food production, climate change in China has reduced sunshine duration and made rainfall more irregular, increasing the likelihood of climate-related disasters such as drought and flooding. Flooding decreased the yields of rice by 8% over the last 20 years. As China is the biggest food producer and importer in the world, what happens in the agricultural sector of China has an immediate effect on the global food system. China increased its grain self sufficiency by expanding agriculture areas to regions with less rain, giving them water with irrigation systems. Now those fields are at risk from water shortage while the irrigation systems demand huge amounts of water what cause depletion of groundwater in many regions. The government of China is trying to address the problem by different measures like reducing food waste, increasing international cooperation. But some of the measures like using more fertilizers produced from coal can exacerbate the problem. Adaptation strategies for food security to combat climate change focus on a combination of micro and macro level approaches. This includes advancing local grain storage technologies to better handle supply distributions and implementing food policy reforms.

==== Fishing Industry ====
Due to overfishing, pollution, global temperature increase, and change in pH to the world's oceans, the South China Sea is suffering from a lack in biodiversity among marine life. Historically, China was the world's largest capture fisheries and aquaculture producer, making the fish market a significant part of the Chinese economy. Due to the environmental impacts, coral reefs in the South China Sea are dying, decreasing the amount of marine life in the South China Sea. Fisheries are not able to catch the amount of fish that was once brought to the fish market, making that part of the economy suffer. The amount of fishing in China is unsustainable, and therefore declining. The fishing industry supplies a significant amount of jobs, exports, and domestic consumption, which will disappear if the fishing industry collapses.

== Mitigation ==
2025 saw China's first 12-month decline in carbon dioxide emissions attributable to growth in renewable energy. The 2016 decline is attributable to a slump after stimulus measures, and 2022's decline is attributable to zero-Covid controls.

In general, the climate policy of China can be described as "underpromise so that it can overdeliver". China sets for itself low climate targets that cannot surely prevent a 2 degree temperature rise, but it mostly achieves and even overachieves its targets. China wants to peak its carbon emissions before 2030 and become carbon neutral by 2060. The paramount leader of China declared that his country will stop financing coal power plants abroad. China achieved 9 of its 15 climate targets in the Paris agreement before it was planned to happen. The climate policy of China can become more effective as a result of higher climate ambition of other countries and better cooperation with the USA. In March 2022 China increased its fossil fuel production "amid growing fears of global energy shortages and rising concerns of an economic slump". In 2024, some scientists suggested the CO_{2} emissions from energy and cement may have peaked, but emissions of perfluorocarbons rose. Those gases are linked to industrial processes like production of aluminium, and non-stick cookware coatings. They account for a very little part of emissions currently, but they are thousands times stronger greenhouse gases than CO_{2}, stay in the atmosphere for tens of thousands years and their emissions rate increased by up to 70%.

The main climate targets of China as of 2022:

- Peak CO_{2} emissions before the year 2030
- Reach net zero emissions before the year 2060

Calculations in 2021 showed that for giving the world a 50% chance of avoiding a temperature rise of 2 degrees or more China should increase its climate commitments by 7%. For a 95% chance it should increase the commitments by 24%. For giving a 50% chance of staying below 1.5 degrees China should increase its commitments by 41%.

In 2022, China issued its climate targets in the 14th Five-Year Plan. These include reducing the economy's energy intensity by 13.5%, reducing the CO_{2} intensity of the economy by 18%, increasing in the share of non-fossil energy to about 20%. The change is in comparison to the numbers for the year 2021. All three targets are to be achieved by 2025.

In the beginning of the year 2022 government-supported research said China will peak CO_{2} emissions in the year 2027 at 12.2Gt and reach net zero carbon emissions before 2060 if it will change its development model.

=== Renewable energy ===
Benefitting from favorable policies and declining costs of modules, photovoltaic solar installation has grown consistently. In 2023, China added 60% of the world's new capacity.

Most energy in China comes from coal

Development of carbon dioxide emissions in China

The People's Republic of China is both the world's largest energy consumer and the largest industrial country. China is currently the world's largest emitter of greenhouse gases, and coal in China is a major cause of global warming. China is also the world's largest renewable energy producer, and the largest producer of hydroelectricity, solar power and wind power in the world. The energy policy of China is connected to its industrial policy, where the goals of China's industrial production dictate its energy demand management.

China is the world's top electricity producer from renewable energy sources. China installed over 430 GW of renewables in 2025, reaching a total installed renewable capacity of over 2.34 TW by the end of the year. The country aims to achieve peak emissions by 2030 and carbon neutrality by 2060; emissions may have already peaked in 2024, six years ahead of the 2030 goal.

=== Energy efficiency ===
A 2011 report by a project facilitated by World Resources Institute stated that the 11th five-year plan (2005 to 2010), in response to worsening energy intensity in the 2002-2005 period, set a goal of a 20% improvement of energy intensity. The report stated that this goal likely was achieved or nearly achieved. The next five-year plan set a goal of improving energy intensity by 16%.

China set itself a target to limit its primary energy consumption to 5 btce by 2020.

In 2022 China published a plan of energy conservation for the 14th five-year plan (2021 to 2025) with a target of cutting energy consumption per unit of GDP by 13.5% by the year 2025 in comparison to the level of 2020. The plan regards 17 different sectors in the economy. In some sectors 20% - 40% of the capacities are not meeting the standards they need to meet by 2025. This policy expects to benefit the biggest companies who have the possibility to reach the targets.

In the provinces of China, there are various projects held aiming to solve emissions reduction and energy-saving, which is a big step in tackling climate change. Beijing is developing in replacing traditional bulbs with energy-saving light bulbs. Cities such as Rizhao and Dezhou are promoting solar energy in the building heating system. Besides, Tsinghua University launched a lead on low-carbon city development. The city is currently working with Tsinghua University to improve the urban environment by introducing renewable energy into industries and households.

China advances "nearly zero energy buildings" Such buildings can consume 70% less energy in very cold areas and 60% less in other regions. According to Jiang Wanrong (the vice-minister of housing and urban-rural development in China), 60% of the floor area in the public buildings of China was adjusted to the energy efficiency standards for buildings, as of December 2023. There are around 80 standards of this type in China.

=== Transport ===
Bicycles are common in China However, in the last 40 years cars use has displaced bicycles, leading to deterioration of air quality and to traffic congestion. The Chinese government responded by introducing bicycle sharing systems and bike lanes. More than 360 Chinese cities have dockless bike-sharing systems that deploy nearly 20 million bicycles that travel an average of 47 million kilometres per day. According to the World Resources Institute report, dockless bike-sharing systems reduced China's GHG emissions by 4.8 million tonnes of CO_{2} annually.

China makes considerable efforts to expand and improve its public transportation network, what creates health benefits and have significant importance for emission reduction. According to official data, in 2023 the number of trips in urban public transportation increased by 27.7%.

Tianjin, with more than 13 million dwellers received the Sustainable Transport Award for the year 2024 due to its efforts to improve and expand non motorized and public transport, making it accessible. The policy of the city had an impact on policies at the regional and country level and received support from the World Bank (this is its biggest investment in this domain). According to the statement of the Institute for Transportation & Development policy which accorded the award, "Thus, the city's recent investments into sustainable mobility policy and infrastructure have the potential to serve as a model for the rest of China as the nation works towards achieving carbon neutrality before 2060."

=== Forests ===
In 2020 the forests of China held around 7.62 billion tonnes of carbon (which are equivalent to 28 billion tonnes of carbon dioxide). By 2100 the number could elevate to 19.59 billion tonnes of carbon. The forest coverage of the country grew from 10% of the overall territory in 1949 to 25% in 2024 and the green belt project contributed to the achievement.

=== Policies and legislation ===
Climate change has not been a priority to China until around 2008, when this issue was brought to a higher platform. Chinese state affairs operate as a central system, not a federal system. For example, the central government makes decisions and the local governments fulfill them. As a result, the local governments receive constraints and are measured by their performance from the central governments. Solving environmental issues such as climate change requires long-term investments in money, resources, and time. It is believed that these efforts will be detrimental to economic growth, which is of particular importance to the promotion of local government executives. This is why local governments have no engagement in addressing this issue.

In China's first NDC submission, key areas were identified for climate change adaptation, including agriculture, water resources, and vulnerable areas. It also mentioned that an adaptation strategy should be implemented through regional strategies. Flooding in cities is being tackled by collecting and recycling rainwater. In 2013, China issued its National Strategy for Climate Change Adaptation and set goals of reducing vulnerability, strengthening monitoring, and raising public awareness. Efforts on implementation have been put in adapting forestry, meteorological management, infrastructure, and risk planning.

The development of technology and economy in China share more responsibility in tackling climate change. After facing the 2011 smog issue, China's government launched an extensive strategy, which is to improve air quality by reducing the growth of coal consumption. Nevertheless, the trade war that involved China as one of the leading participants has resulted in the loss of control of polluting industries, especially in the steel and cement during 2018. Fortunately, nearly 70 multinational and local brands implemented the monitoring data by The Institute of Public & Environmental Affairs (IPE) in China, stimulating nearly 8,000 suppliers approaching regulatory violations.

==== Paris Agreement ====
The Paris Agreement is a legally binding international agreement. Its main goal is to limit global warming to below 1.5 degrees Celsius, compared to pre-industrial levels. The Nationally Determined Contributions (NDCs) are the plans to fight climate change adapted for each country, which outlines specific goals and targets for the upcoming five years to help mitigate the effects of climate change. Every party in the agreement has different targets based on its own historical climate records and country's circumstances and all the targets for each country are stated in their NDC.

China is currently a member of the United Nations Framework Convention on Climate Change, the Paris Agreement. As a part of this agreement it has agreed to the 2016 Nationally Determined Contributions (NDC).

The NDC target regarding the China against climate change and greenhouse gas emissions under the Paris Agreement are the following:

- Peak of carbon dioxide emissions around 2030.
- 60% to 65% reduction of Carbon dioxide emission per unit of its gross domestic product (GDP), compared to 2005.
- Increase the forest stock volume by around 4.5 billion cubic meters on the 2005 level.

In the NDC of China there is a list of things that have been achieved by 2014:

- Proactive approach to climate change (for example enhancing mechanisms to effectively defend key areas).

==== Gross Ecosystem Product (GEP) ====
China launched the Gross Ecosystem Product (GEP) in 2020. It measures the contribution of ecosystems to the economy, including by regulating climate. In 2023, already 15 local governments have issued guidelines about it, and around 200 projects were launched. The first province to issue local rules about GEP was Zhejiang , and a year later it has already decided the fate of a project in the Deqing region. For example, the GEP of Chengtian Radon Spring Nature Reserve has been calculated as US$43 million.

===== Progress =====
Climate action tracker (CAT) is an independent scientific analysis that tracks government climate action and measures it against the globally agreed Paris Agreement. Climate action tracker found China actions to be "Highly insufficient".

According to analysis from the Global Energy Monitor: "China accounts for more than 95 per cent of the coal plant capacity beginning construction in 2023". The report said that "building new unabated coal power plants must stop to limit global warming to the critical threshold of 1.5 degrees Celsius".

=== National carbon trading scheme ===
The Chinese national carbon trading scheme is an intensity-based trading system for carbon dioxide emissions by China, which started operating in 2021. The Chinese Ministry of Finance originally proposed a carbon tax in 2010, to come into effect in 2012 or 2013. The tax was never passed; in February 2021 the government instead set up an emission trading scheme (ETS) where emitters can buy and sell emission credits.

China is the largest emitter of greenhouse gases (GHG) and many major Chinese cities had severe air pollution through the 2010s, with the situation improving in the 2020s. The scheme is run by the Ministry of Ecology and Environment, which eventually plans to limit emissions from six of China's top carbon dioxide emitting industries. In 2021, it started with its power plants, and covers 40% of China's emissions, which is 15% of world emissions. China was able to gain experience in drafting and implementation of an ETS plan from the United Nations Framework Convention on Climate Change (UNFCCC), where China was part of the Clean Development Mechanism (CDM).

China's national ETS is the largest of its kind, and helps China achieve its Nationally Determined Contribution (NDC) to the Paris Agreement. In July 2021, permits were being handed out for free rather than auctioned, and the market price per tonne of CO_{2}e was around RMB 50, roughly half of the EU ETS and the UK ETS but better compared to the US, which has no formal cap-and-trade program.

The ETS reduced carbon emissions by up to 18.2%. It reduced inequality and improve welfare. Around a third of all health benefits from air pollution reduction, were achieved by the ETS. In some circumstances it reduced GDP and innovation. The system reduced emissions from the power sector by 13% during the years 2013-2020. By 2027, it is expected to expand to all major industrial emmiters and began to establish an absolute cap.

=== Eco-cities ===
The Chinese government has strategically promoted eco-cities in China as a policy measure for addressing rising greenhouse gas emissions resulting from China's rapid urbanization and industrialization. These projects seek to blend green technologies and sustainable infrastructure to build large, environmentally friendly cities nationwide. The government has launched three programs to incentivize cities to undertake eco-city construction, encouraging hundreds of cities to announce plans for eco-city developments.

=== International cooperation ===
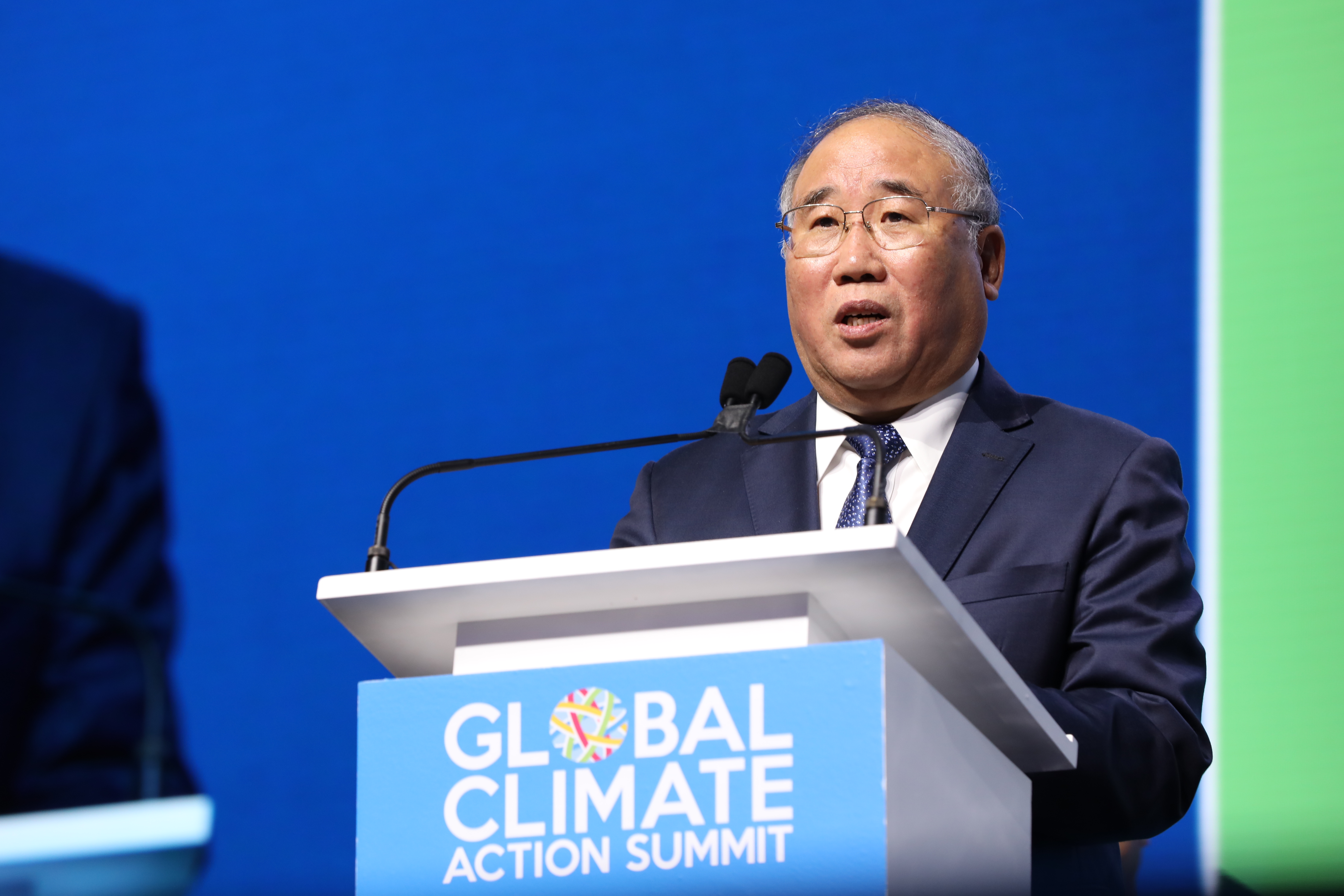
Xie Zhenhua, Special Representative for Climate Change Affairs of China, speaking at the Global Climate Action Summit in 2018.

Attitudes of the Chinese government on climate change, specifically regarding the role of China in climate change action, have shifted notably in recent years. Historically, climate change was largely seen as a problem that has been created by and should be solved by industrialized countries; in 2015, China said it supports the "common but differentiated responsibilities" principle, which holds that since China is still developing, its abilities and capacities to reduce emissions are comparatively lower than developed countries'.

In 2012, China established its National Center for Climate Change Strategy and International Cooperation as part of its effort to develop world-class research in this area. Like the National Development and Reform Commission's Energy Research Institute, the National Center for Climate Change Strategy regularly works with international research institutions and think tanks.

In 2018, the government has urged countries to continue to support the Paris agreement, even in the wake of the United States' withdrawal in 2017. In 2020, Chinese leader Xi Jinping announced at the UN General Assembly in New York that his country will end its contribution to global heating and achieve carbon neutrality by 2060 by adopting "more vigorous policies and measures." By 2024, China was increasingly seen as a global climate leader in Asia and globally.

Both internationally and within the People's Republic of China, there has been an ongoing debate over China's economic responsibilities for climate change mitigation. The argument has been made that China has a crucial role to play in keeping global warming under 2 °C, and that this cannot be accomplished unless coal use, which accounts for the majority of China's emissions, falls sharply. CCP general secretary Xi Jinping says China will "phase down" coal use from 2026 - and will not build new coal-fired projects abroad - but some governments and campaigners say the plans are not going far enough.

The People's Republic of China is an active participant in the climate change talks and other multilateral environmental negotiations, and claims to take environmental challenges seriously but is pushing for the developed world to help developing countries to a greater extent.

However the Belt and Road Initiative is constructing coal-fired power stations (for example Emba Hunutlu power station in Turkey) thus increasing greenhouse gas emissions from other countries.

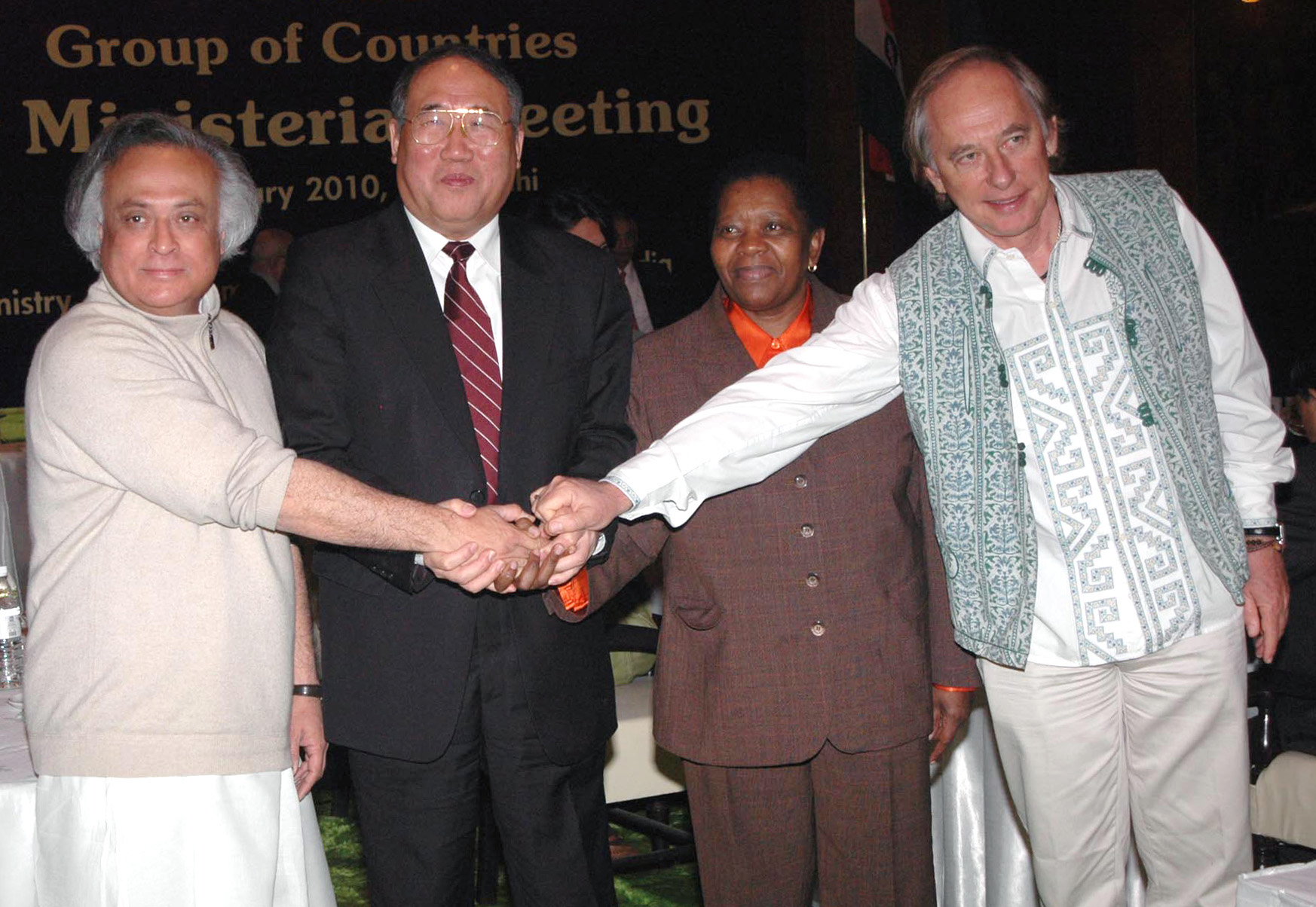
Environment ministers from the BASIC countries, which includes China, meet in 2010 to discuss climate change mitigation following the COP15 summit.

China is a part of the United Nations Framework Convention on Climate Change, BASIC Alliance. This alliance is an international commitment to work in partnership with Brazil, South Africa, and India. BASIC's international commitments and goals are to be carbon net-zero before 2060, and to help achieve the global goal from the UNFCCC of reducing emissions to 1.5% degrees Celsius before pre-industrial levels. In 2021, at the UN General Assembly, Chinese leader Xi Jinping stated that China will no longer fund coal-fired power plants abroad. Xi also repeated the country's commitment to achieving carbon neutrality by 2060.

In 2022 the cooperation on climate issues between China and US considerably improved. The countries create "a group from both countries to work toward quickly reducing greenhouse gas emissions." John Kerry mentioned a possibility of technological help from the part of US and informational help from the part of China.

In July 2023 John Kerry visited China for advance climate cooperation. The main achievement of the visit was some progress in the fields of: "methane reduction commitments; reducing China's reliance on coal; China's objections to trade restrictions on solar panel and battery components; and climate finance." This was obtained despite many currently existing obstacles to cooperation.

In July 2023 China and the European Union hold the Fourth EU-China High Level Environment and Climate Dialogue, declaring they will continue to cooperate in stopping climate change, biodiversity loss and pollution. Both sides agree to ensure the success of COP28, implement the Kunming-Montreal Global Biodiversity Framework, advance the High Seas Treaty, cooperate in water policy, reach a global agreement on plastic pollution by 2024. Both sides agree to support Circular economy.

In recent times the China government has made climate change a national strategy and integrated it into the overall layout of ecological civilization construction and economic and social development. Systematic thinking has been incorporated throughout the process of carbon peaking and neutrality. Indeed, China regards green and low-carbon development as an important part of its national economic and social development plan.

By 15 November 2025, China together with the European Union, Brazil and 15 other countries had joined the Open Coalition on Compliance Carbon Markets. The coalition aims to establish a global carbon market and is considered as one of the main results of COP 30. A global carbon market can speed up emission reduction seven-fold. China can get more revenue from this project in comparison to other countries - 2.9% of the overall governmental revenue with a price of 50 dollars per ton of CO2.

== Adaptation ==
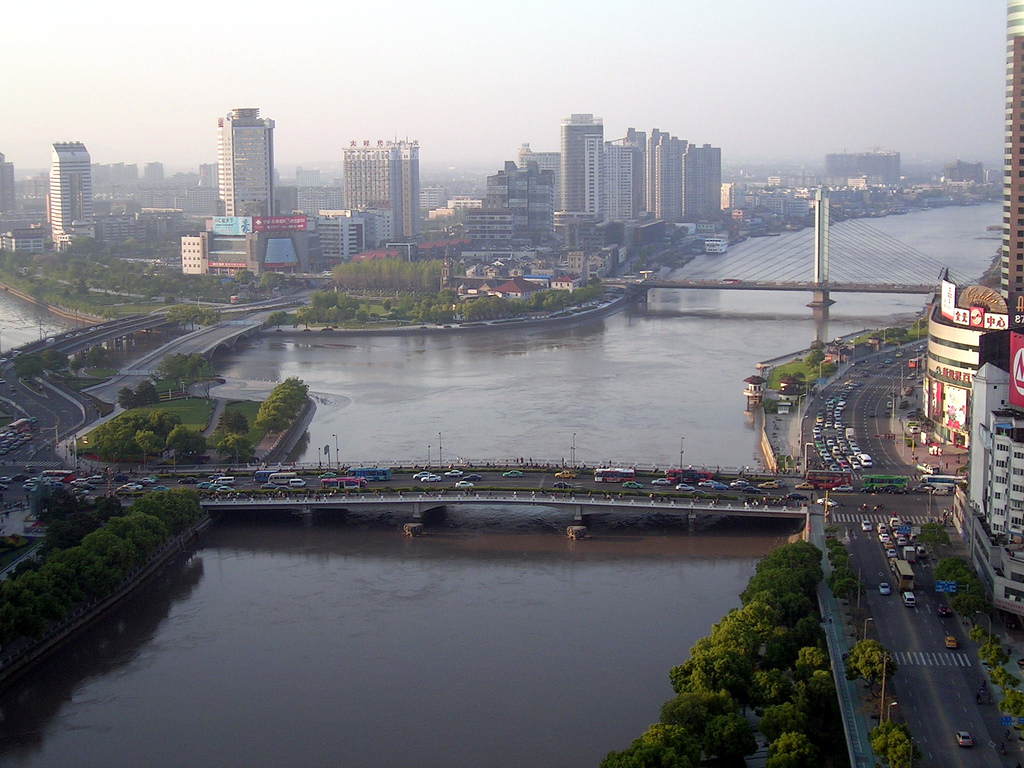
Pictured here is the conversion of three large rivers in Ningbo, China. The country is taking substantial measures to combat the flash floods predicted to intensify in the future.

China has experienced a seven-fold increase in the frequency of floods since the 1950s, rising every decade. The frequency of extreme rainfall has increased and is predicted to continue to increase in the western and southern parts of China. The country is currently undertaking efforts to reduce the threat of these floods (which have the potential effect of completely destroying vulnerable communities), largely focusing on improving the infrastructure responsible for tracking and maintaining adequate water levels. That being said, the country is promoting the extension of technologies for water allocation and water-saving mechanisms. In the country's National Climate Change Policy Program, one of the goals specifically set out is to enhance the ability to bear the impacts of climate change, as well as to raise the public awareness on climate change. China's National Climate Change Policy states that it will integrate climate change policies into the national development strategy. In China, this national policy comes in the form of its "Five Year Plans for Economic and Social Development". China's Five Year Plans serve as the strategic road maps for the country's development. The goals spelled out in the Five Year Plans are mandatory as government officials are held responsible for meeting the targets.

The Great Green Wall is a major tree planting initiative aiming to combat climate change. In November 2024, China's government reported, that after 46 years of work it finished the 3,000 kilometers green belt around the Taklamakan Desert.The part of the country covered by deserts declined from 27.2% in previous decade to 26.8%.

== Society and culture ==
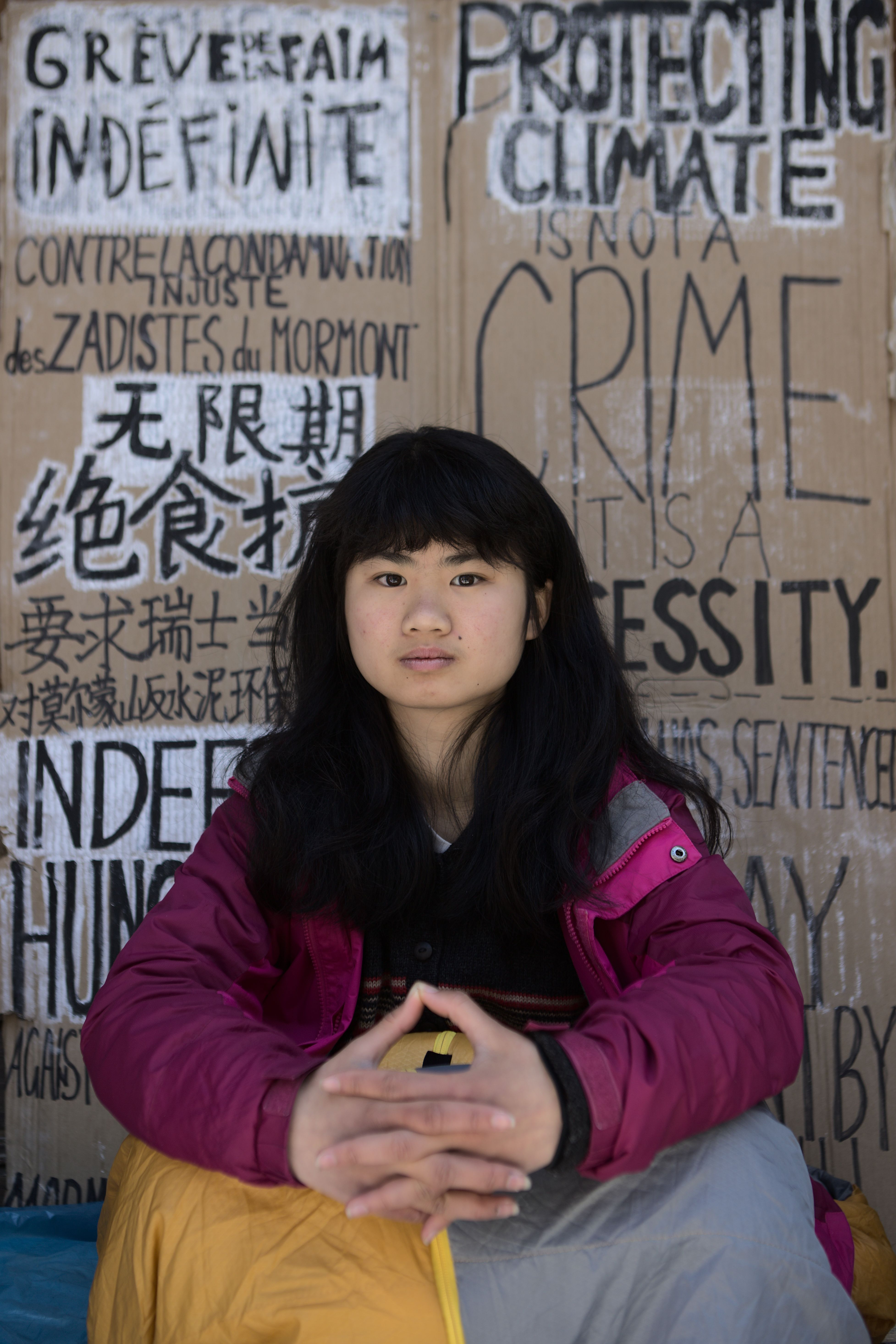
Howey Ou, a Chinese climate activist.

=== Public opinion ===
According to a study from 2017 conducted by the China Climate Change Communication program, 94% of interviewees supported fulfilling the Paris agreement, 96.8% of interviewees supported international cooperation on global climate change, and more than 70% of interviewees were willing to purchase environmentally friendly products. 98.7% of interviewees supported implementing climate change education at schools. Respondents were most concerned about the air pollution caused by climate change. The investigation included 4025 samples.

The investigation showed that Chinese citizens agreed that they were experiencing climate change and that it was caused by human activities.

Furthermore, most Chinese citizens believe individual action on climate change can help, although the government is still seen as the entity most responsible for dealing with climate change. If the government does take action, fiscal and taxation policies are seen as potentially effective.

=== Activism ===
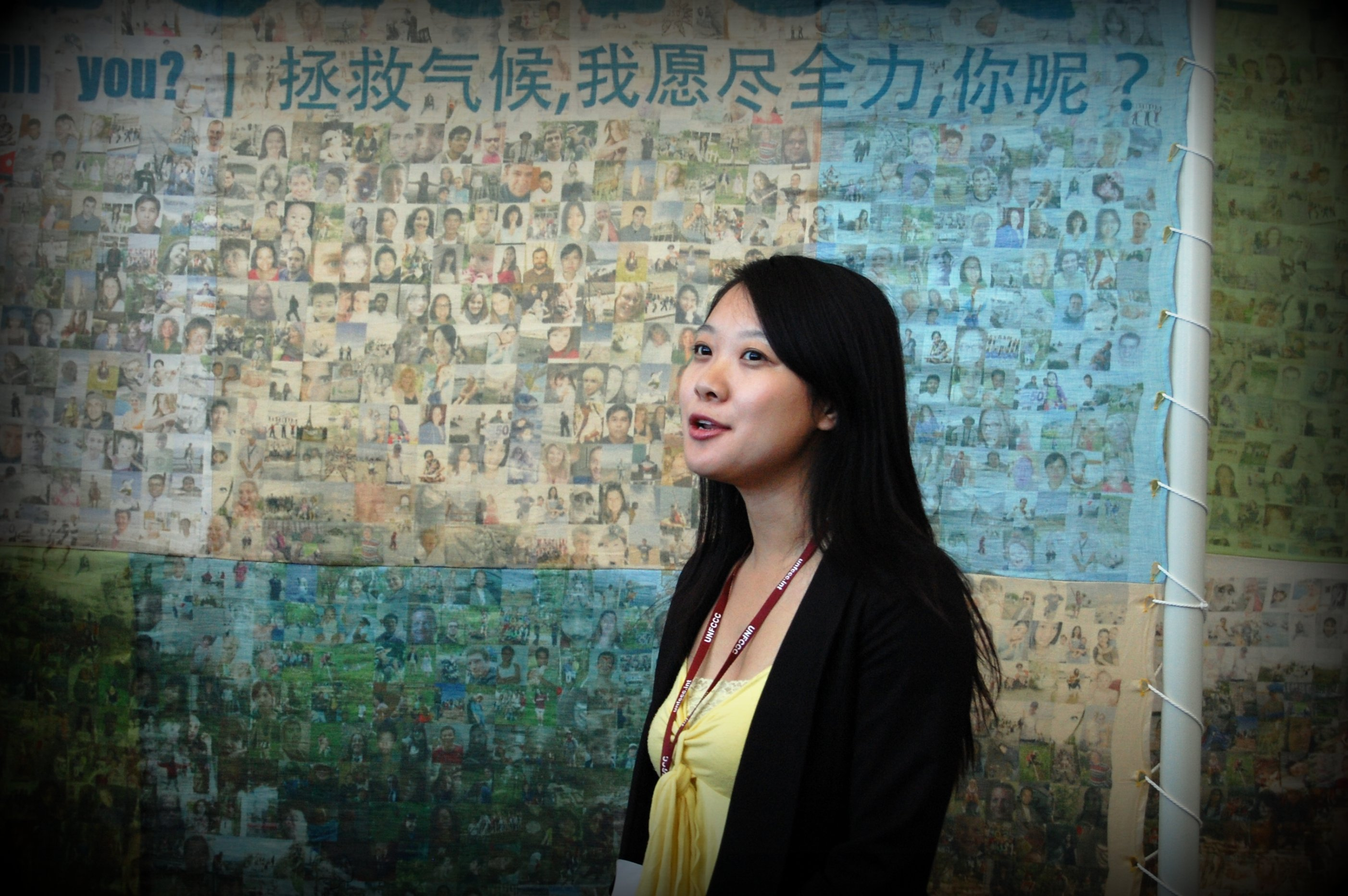
"Great Climate Wall of China", an installation featuring portraits of Chinese citizens calling for action on climate change.

In 2019, activist Howey Ou staged the country's first school strike for climate in Guilin. Organisations connected to the government, such as China Youth Climate Action Network, have also disseminated training and public awareness activities related to the issue.

== See also ==
- China Carbon Forum
- China Beijing Environmental Exchange
- Deforestation and climate change
- Environment of China
- Green growth in China
- Plug-in electric vehicles in China
- Tianjin Climate Exchange
