= NYSE Euronext =

Euro-American multinational financial services corporation

NYSE Euronext, Inc.
- Type: Public
- Traded as: NYSE: NYX
- Industry: Financial services
- Predecessors: NYSE Group, Inc. Euronext N.V.
- Founded: April 4, 2007; 19 years ago
- Defunct: 2013
- Fate: Acquired by Intercontinental Exchange, Euronext later spun off
- Successor: Intercontinental Exchange
- Headquarters: 11 Wall Street, New York, New York (state), United States
- Area served: United States, European Union
- Key people: Duncan L. Niederauer (CEO)
- Services: Derivatives, equity trading platforms, futures and options markets, market data, securities exchanges
- Revenue: US$3.75 billion (2013)
- Operating income: US$850 million (2011)
- Net income: US$619 million (2011)
- Total assets: US$13.07 billion (2011)
- Total equity: US$6.581 billion (2011)
- Number of employees: 3,061 (2012)
- Divisions: New York Stock Exchange, Euronext (Amsterdam, Paris, Brussels, Lisbon), NYSE Arca, NYSE Liffe, NYSE Technologies
- Website: NYX.com

NYSE Euronext, Inc. was a transatlantic multinational financial services corporation that operated multiple securities exchanges, including the New York Stock Exchange, Euronext and NYSE Arca (formerly known as ArcaEx). NYSE merged with Archipelago Holdings on March 7, 2006, forming NYSE Group, Inc. On April 4, 2007, NYSE Group, Inc. merged with Euronext N.V. to form the first global equities exchange, with its headquarters in Lower Manhattan. The corporation was then acquired by Intercontinental Exchange, which subsequently spun off Euronext.

== Overview ==
NYSE Euronext provides financial products and services in cash equities, futures, options, exchange-traded products, bonds, market data and commercial technology. Its exchanges operated across several asset classes and six countries, and included the New York Stock Exchange, Liffe, Euronext and NYSE Arca. It had more than 8,000 listed issues,[1] including 90% of the Dow Jones Industrial Average and 80% of the S&P 500.[2] Trading on NYSE Euronext's equity markets accounted for more than one-third of global cash equities volume. The company also operated a major European derivatives exchange by value of trading.

NYSE Euronext is part of the S&P 500 index and the only exchange operator in the S&P 100 index.

NYSE Euronext is a Delaware corporation, though the principal executive office of NYSE Euronext is located at 11 Wall Street, New York, New York 10005. The European headquarters are at 39 Rue Cambon, 75001 in Paris, France.

== Locations ==
Below is a list of major NYSE Euronext locations:

- Amsterdam, Netherlands
- Belfast, Northern Ireland
- Brussels, Belgium
- Chicago, Illinois, United States of America
- Lisbon, Portugal
- London, United Kingdom
- New York City, New York, United States of America
- Palo Alto, California, United States of America
- Paris, France
- San Francisco, California, United States of America

== Mergers and acquisitions ==
=== NYSE and Archipelago Holdings ===
The merger between NYSE and Archipelago Holdings was initially approved in 2005 by a 95% majority of voting NYSE members. The acquisition of Archipelago, which held possession of highly regarded market technology at the time, was intended to bring automated trading to NYSE markets (which had previously utilized an "open outcry" system) and increase efficiency.

For the first time in its 213-year history, the New York Stock Exchange became a for-profit company, and began trading publicly on its own stock exchange under the NYX ticker. Owners of the 1,366 NYSE seats received 80,177 shares of NYSE Group stock plus $300,000 in cash and $70,571 in dividends for each seat. The completion of this deal created two new branches of the NYSE Group: NYSE Arca and NYSE Arca Europe, which launched after the acquisition of Euronext.

=== NYSE Group and Euronext merger April 4, 2007 ===
Logo used between 2007 and 2012

In April 2006, NYSE Group and Euronext signed a merger agreement, subject to shareholder vote and regulatory approval. Euronext shareholders gave approval to the transaction on December 19, 2006, and shareholders from the NYSE Group followed suit one day later. In April 2007 the Euronext shareholders tendering shares can receive NYSE shares and cash amounting to $11,141 million from NYSE Euronext for their assets. About 94% of the 112,557,259 shares are tendered in the first round.

The NYSE Group and Euronext merger on April 4, 2007, signaled the creation of the world's largest and most liquid exchange group—NYSE Euronext.

=== NYSE Euronext and NYFIX ===
NYSE Euronext, through its wholly owned subsidiary NYSE Technologies, Inc. acquired NYFIX, Inc. (Nasdaq: NYFX) for $144 million in November 2009. NYSE Euronext incorporated NYFIX's trading software into the company's package of offerings to customers.

=== Attempted merger between NYSE Euronext and Deutsche Börse ===
In 2011, Bloomberg reported that the German exchange operator Deutsche Börse was in advanced talks to buy NYSE Euronext for $9.53 billion in a deal that would create the world's largest trading powerhouse. The shares of both companies were temporarily frozen on the news due to the risk of large price movements and clarifications of the deal. A successful deal would see the new company becoming the world's largest stock exchange operator with a market capitalization of listed companies equal to $15 trillion.

The proposed group would have dual headquarters, in Deutsche Boerse's newly built green tower near Frankfurt, Germany, and in New York City at 11 Wall Street. It would be led by a board with seventeen members, fifteen directors plus the chairman and the CEO. Of the fifteen directors, nine to be designated by Deutsche Boerse and six by NYSE Euronext. Current NYSE Euronext CEO Duncan Niederauer would assume the same role with the newly founded company and would lead an executive committee with an equal number of current Deutsche Boerse and NYSE Euronext executives.

On July 7, 2011, NYSE Euronext shareholders voted in favor of the merger, and on July 13, 2011, Deutsche Boerse shareholders approved the deal as well. These decisions move the two sides closer to completing the transaction, which must still pass through forty separate regulatory approval processes to be finalized.

The merger was subject to review in both the United States and with the European Union (EU) for concerns it could create a "de facto monopoly".

In October 2011, CEO Niederauer said the company had received the EU's so-called statement of objections, which was more than 100 pages long, and would be responding within two weeks, possibly by asking for the opportunity for an oral hearing with the regulators. The EU examination of the proposal formally began June 29 has said its expanded probe has a Dec. 13 deadline. In March, Joaquín Almunia, the EU's antitrust commissioner, expressed concern that the deal would maybe monopolize the derivatives market due to Deutsche Boerse's "vertical silo" which routes all trade clearing through its own services. Almunia said then he preferred a "more open business model" for markets.

On December 22, 2011, Deutsche Boerse won U.S. antitrust approval to buy NYSE Euronext, on condition that a Deutsche Boerse subsidiary, the International Securities Exchange, divest its 31.5 percent interest in Direct Edge. NYSE Euronext and Deutsche Boerse AG delayed the deadline for completing their merger until March 31, 2012, so the exchange operators could try to persuade European regulators to approve the deal.

On February 1, 2012, the European Union blocked the planned merger between NYSE Euronext and Deutsche Boerse. The European Commission—the EU's executive body—ruled against the merger because, they said, the combined exchange would control more than 90% of the trade in European derivatives. The European Commission report stated, "The merger between Deutsche Boerse and NYSE Euronext would have led to a near-monopoly in European financial derivatives worldwide... These markets are at the heart of the financial system and it is crucial for the whole European economy that they remain competitive".

On February 2, 2012, the NYSE Euronext and Deutsche Börse agreed with strong opposition by the EU for the planned merger, to scrap the merger.

=== Intercontinental Exchange acquisition of NYSE Euronext ===
On December 20, 2012, the boards of directors of both Intercontinental Exchange (ICE) and the NYSE Euronext approved an $8 billion acquisition of NYSE Euronext. Under the terms shareholders of NYSE would receive either $33.12 in cash for each share or .2581 IntercontinentalExchange Inc. shares, or a combination of $11.27 in cash per share plus .1703 shares of stock. The acquisition is subject to regulator approval, though since the operations of ICE and NYSE have little in common—ICE is largely devoted to trading commodities, as opposed to NYSE's business of trading stocks and securities—the deal is not expected to be blocked. ICE said that after the deal closed it would sell the Euronext portion of the company, including stock exchanges in Amsterdam, Brussels, Lisbon and Paris. The deal went through and Euronext is a sister division to NYSE and part of ICE. ICE CEO Jeffrey Sprecher would continue in that position at the combined company, while NYSE CEO Duncan Niederauer would serve as president. The future of the New York Stock Exchange's historic trading floor under ICE has not been announced. ICE closed the high profile and historic trading floors of its other earlier acquisitions, the International Petroleum Exchange and the New York Board of Trade in New York.

== Company structure ==
=== Derivatives ===
The Derivatives segment consists of NYSE Euronext's derivatives trading and clearing businesses. This includes NYSE Liffe, NYSE Liffe Clearing, NYSE Liffe US, NYSE Amex Options, NYSE Arca Option, and related derivatives market data.

==== NYSE Liffe ====
NYSE Liffe comprises the derivatives market operated by LIFFE Administration and Management, Euronext Amsterdam, Euronext Brussels, Euronext Lisbon, and Euronext Paris. It offers customers a derivatives trading platform as well as a wide choice of products.

Through a single electronic trading platform, NYSE Liffe offers customers access to a wide range of interest-rate, equity, index, commodity and currency derivative products. This platform has been designed to handle significant order flows and transaction volumes. Orders can be matched either on a price/time or pro rata basis, configurable by contract, with transacted prices and volumes and the aggregate size of all bids and offers at each price level updated on a real-time basis. Users can continually notified of all active orders in the central order book, making market depth easy to monitor.

NYSE Liffe also offers its customers the Bclear and Cscreen services, which bridge the listed and over-the-counter (OTC) markets. This provides a simple and cost-effective way to register and process wholesale derivatives trades through NYSE Liffe to clearing at NYSE Liffe Clearing. Following the launch of NYSE Liffe Clearing, NYSE Liffe assumed full responsibility for clearing activities on its own London market.

NYSE Liffe US, NYSE Euronext's U.S. futures exchange, makes available for trading full- and mini-sized gold and silver futures, options on full-sized gold and silver futures and futures on Morgan Stanley Capital International (MSCI) Indices. A significant minority equity stake in NYSE Liffe US is held by six external investors: Citadel Securities, DRW Investments, Getco, Goldman Sachs, Morgan Stanley and UBS. Under this ownership structure, NYSE Euronext remains the largest shareholder in the entity and consolidates its financial reporting. NYSE Euronext manages the day-to-day operations of NYSE Liffe US, which operates under the supervision of a separate board of directors.

==== NYSE Amex Options ====
The NYSE Amex Options business uses a hybrid model combining both auction-based and electronic trading capabilities that is designed to provide a stable, liquid and less volatile market. This feature provides the opportunity for price and/or size improvement.

In 2010, NYSE Euronext announced the sale of a significant equity interest in NYSE Amex Options to seven external investors: Bank of America Merrill Lynch, Barclays Capital, Citadel Securities, Citi, Goldman Sachs, TD Ameritrade, and UBS. Under the framework, NYSE Euronext remains the largest shareholder in the entity and manages the day-to-day operations of NYSE Amex Options, which operates under the supervision of a separate board of directors and chief executive officer. NYSE Euronext consolidates this entity for financial reporting purposes.

==== NYSE Arca Options ====
NYSE Arca Options, the other of NYSE Euronext's two U.S. options exchanges, offers immediate, cost-effective electronic order execution in nearly two thousand options issues. The NYSE Arca Options business uses a technology platform and market structure designed to enhance the speed and quality of trade execution for its customers, as well as to attract additional sources of liquidity. Its structure allows market makers to access its markets remotely and integrates floor-based participants as well.

=== Cash Trading and Listings ===
The Cash Trading and Listings segment includes the New York Stock Exchange, Euronext, NYSE Amex, NYSE Arca, NYSE Alternext, NYSE Arca Europe, SmartPool, BlueNext, and NYSE Blue, as well as related cash trading market data.

==== New York Stock Exchange ====
The New York Stock Exchange is registered as a national securities exchange under the Exchange Act. In addition to common stock, preferred stock and warrants, the NYSE lists debt and corporate structured products, such as capital securities, mandatory convertibles, and repackaged securities.

==== Euronext ====
Euronext is the first integrated cross-border exchange, combining the stock exchanges of Amsterdam, Paris, Brussels and Lisbon into a single market. Issuers who meet European Union regulatory standards are qualified for listing on the regulated markets operated by Euronext. The company's exchanges list a wide variety of securities, including domestic and international equity securities, convertible bonds, warrants, trackers and debt securities, including corporate and government bonds.

All of Euronext's markets are operated by its subsidiaries, each of which holds a national license as an exchange operator.

==== NYSE Amex ====
NYSE Euronext completed its acquisition of the American Stock Exchange (Amex) on October 1, 2008. The transaction extended NYSE Euronext's leadership in U.S. option, cash equities, and exchange-traded funds (ETFs), making it the third largest U.S. equity options marketplace based on number of contracts traded. Since the merger, Amex has been integrated into the company, with former Amex listings now trading directly on the NYSE, and has begun trading certain Nasdaq-listed securities.

NYSE Arca is the first electronic market to offer listed ETP issuers a Lead Market Maker program, which encourages liquidity provision that contributes to the best prices and depth in the ETP marketplace. It is registered as a national securities exchange under the Exchange Act.

==== NYSE Alternext ====
NYSE Alternext was created by NYSE Euronext to meet the needs of small and mid-sized companies seeking simplified access to the stock market. Its streamlined listing requirements and trading rules are suited to the size and business needs of such firms. The rules also ensure investor transparency. NYSE Alternext's special listing procedures, unique market model, and listings of sponsor companies for members are its most notable features.

NYSE Alternext is an exchange-regulated market with a lighter regulatory regime. It is not a regulated market as defined by the Markets in Financial Instruments Directive (MiFID), but rather is regulated by NYSE Euronext through a body of rules applicable to intermediaries and listed companies.

==== NYSE Arca Europe ====
NYSE Arca Europe is a pan-European multilateral trading facility (MTF) that extends the trading scope of Euronext's regulated markets by adding blue-chip stocks from 14 European countries: Austria, Czech Republic, Denmark, Finland, France, Germany, Hungary, Ireland, Italy, Norway, Spain, Sweden, Switzerland, and the United Kingdom. Arca Europe integrates this trading facility with the other business components of the company, giving customers the flexibility in trading of an MTF while maintaining the global market reach of NYSE Euronext.

==== SmartPool ====
SmartPool Trading Limited is a UK-registered company supplying an MTF approved by the Financial Services Authority (FSA). It provides an exchange-led dark pool for the execution of block orders covering 15 different European markets, with a full central counter party back-end through LCH.Clearnet and EuroCCP. SmartPool was created by NYSE Euronext in partnership with BNP Paribas, HSBC, and J.P. Morgan Chase.

==== BlueNext and NYSE Blue ====
NYSE Euronext holds a 60% interest in BlueNext with the remaining 40% held by CDC Climat. BlueNext operates a spot market in carbon dioxide emission allowances and credits that is the European leader in the field. It seeks to establish a leading position in trading in environment-related instruments, and has also launched a futures market with physical delivery of allowances and credits.

In September 2010, NYSE Euronext announced plans to create NYSE Blue, a new global company that will focus on environmental and sustainable energy markets. NYSE Euronext contributed its ownership in BlueNext in return for a majority interest in NYSE Blue, and APX, Inc. (a leading provider of regulatory infrastructure and services for environmental and sustainable energy markets) will contribute its business in return for a minority interest in the venture. The transaction closed on February 18, 2011.

=== Information Services and Technology Solutions ===
The Information Services and Technology Solutions segment refers to NYSE Euronext's commercial technology transactions, data, and infrastructure businesses. NYSE Euronext operates NYSE Technologies, Free Market, and also owns NYFIX, Inc.

==== NYSE Technologies ====
NYSE Technologies is the commercial technology division of NYSE Euronext.

NYSE Technologies operates five business:

- Global Market Data
- Trading Solutions
- Exchange Solutions
- Global Connectivity
- Transactions primarily comprises the former NYFIX FIX business and incorporates the NYFIX Marketplace and the FIX Software business.

==== Marché Libre ====
The Free Markets of Brussels and Paris, organized by NYSE Euronext, are not regulated markets in the sense of the EU Directive. The criteria for admission to these markets are much simpler, and listing costs are low. They provide a channel for disseminating buy and sell orders, with trades executed by NYSE Euronext member firms. The securities traded on these markets have not gone through any admission procedures and issuers are not subject to any disclosure requirements. The Free Markets serve companies that are too young or too small to be listed on one of the regulated compartments of NYSE Euronext.

==== NYSE Regulation and FINRA ====
On May 4, 2010, NYSE Euronext and the Financial Industry Regulatory Authority (FINRA) announced that FINRA would assume responsibility for performing the market surveillance and enforcement functions originally conducted by NYSE Regulation. The agreement was subject to review by the Securities and Exchange Commission (SEC) and was completed in June 2010.

Under the announced agreement, FINRA assumed regulatory functions for NYSE Euronext's U.S. equities and options markets – the New York Stock Exchange, NYSE Arca, and NYSE Amex. NYSE Euronext, through its subsidiary NYSE Regulation, remains ultimately responsible for overseeing FINRA's performance of regulatory services for the NYSE markets.

=== Libor administration ===
In early 2014, NYSE Euronext took over the administration of the London interbank offered rate from the British Bankers Association. The new administrator is NYSE Euronext Rates Administration Limited, a London-based, UK registered company, regulated by the UK's Financial Conduct Authority.

== Global marketing and branding ==
NYSE Euronext maintains an active marketing campaign, both for its own brand, as well as for its listed companies. The Global Marketing and Branding department is responsible for the full spectrum of NYSE Euronext's brand marketing, including advertising, marketing communications, event management, and market research.

Through the NYSE Global Partnership Program, NYSE Euronext has created a series of resources to support its listed companies' growth initiatives, so as to act as a conduit that enables them to reach new audiences. NYSE Euronext's 8,000 listed issues provide members with a network of global investors and business leaders with which to interact. The company offers opportunities for co-branded advertising, linking listed companies to one another, as well as to the brand that is NYSE Euronext.

=== Events ===
The Events department of NYSE Euronext is responsible for coordinating bell ceremonies, receptions, conferences, and street events. Beginning in 2010, the NYSE Euronext opened its doors to non-listed companies to utilize NYSE facilities for after-hours events.

==== Opening and closing ceremonies ====
The opening and closing bell ceremonies hosted by the NYSE date back to 1903, taking place Monday through Friday at 9:30 a.m. and 4:00 p.m. respectively in New York City.

The opportunity to ring the bell at the New York Stock Exchange has long been considered an honor. Representatives from listed companies, especially newly listed companies and IPOs, celebrities, politicians, and other dignitaries have become fixtures at the bell podium. Bell ceremonies are seen by millions, and are the most widely watched TV events each day.

The bell tradition has been extended to the branches in Paris, Brussels, and Lisbon. In Amsterdam, the opening bell was replaced by a gong, which is sounded the signal the beginning and end of the trading day. In the European offices, the opening and closing ceremonies take place at 9:00 a.m. and 5:30 p.m., respectively.

==== Experience Square ====
The Broad Street area in front of the Exchange is known as Experience Square, where listed companies are able to market themselves and their products directly to the thousands of visitors to New York's Financial District each day. The façade of the exchange is often used as a billboard to showcase branding and new listings.

==== NYSE Magazine ====
NYSE Magazine is NYSE Euronext's quarterly publication. It provides insights into the world's best companies, giving readers a close-up look at the distinguished leaders who constitute the Exchange community. Written for a sophisticated audience of CEOs and other senior global executives, each issue centers on what makes companies succeed. Designed to foster a sense of community among the NYSE's key constituents, NYSE magazine has grown to become a strategic tool for business leaders that delivers opinions, strategies and insights from their peers. Extended articles, Q&As, videos, photo, and slideshows are now available at www.nysemagazine.com and on iPad via the NYSE magazine app. NYSE magazine print and digital editions reach thousands of opinion leaders around the globe, including top management of publicly traded and private companies, government officials, the financial community and the media. NYSE ceased production of the print edition in 2013 and currently publishes content exclusively online.
