= CBEE =

CBEE may refer to:

- CBEE-FM, a radio station (88.1 FM) licensed to serve Chatham, Ontario, Canada
- China Beijing Environmental Exchange
- Combined Biotechnology Entrance Exam
