= NYSE Technologies =

Former commercial financial tech company

NYSE Technologies was the commercial technology division of NYSE Euronext. NYSE Technologies, Inc. provided comprehensive transaction, data, and infrastructure services and managed solutions for buy-side, sell-side, and exchange communities. The company also provided training, liquidity, infrastructure, and content solutions to broker dealers, institutional investors, market operators, and systematic traders in the United States and internationally. It also provided buy side solutions, including order routing, liquidity discovery, and access to broker-dealers and execution destinations; sell side solutions, including high performance, end-to-end messaging software, and market exchanges, including multi-asset exchange platform data products; and market venues and, managed, and consultancy services.

The company was incorporated in 2000 based in New York City, with sales offices in Chicago, Illinois; London, England; Belfast, Northern Ireland; Paris, France; Amsterdam, the Netherlands; Tokyo, Japan; Singapore; Hong Kong; Sydney, Australia; and Makati, the Philippines. NYSE Technologies, Inc. operated as a subsidiary of Intercontinental Exchange, Inc. until 2015.

== History ==
NYSE Technologies was launched in January 2009, incorporating all the internal technology divisions of NYSE Euronext, NYSE Euronext’s Market Data division and a number of acquisitions including the Securities Industry Automation Corporation (SIAC) in November 2006, Wombat Financial Software, and Atos Euronext Market Solutions in August 2008. In November 2009, NYSE Euronext completed the acquisition of NYFIX, Inc.
