= BlueNext =

European environmental trading exchange, closed down 2012

- Type: Environmental (carbon) exchange
- Location: Paris, France
- Founded: December 2007
- Closed: December 2012
- Owner: NYSE Euronext (60%); Caisse des Dépôts (40%)
- Commodities: emission allowances and emission credits
- Indices: EUA Spot Index
- Website: BlueNext.eu

BlueNext was a European environmental trading exchange, considered the largest CO_{2} permit spot market, with headquarters in Paris, France. On October 26, 2012, BlueNext announced that it would close permanently its spot and derivatives trading operations as of December 5, 2012.

== Overview ==
BlueNext was founded in December 2007 when NYSE Euronext and Caisse des Dépôts purchased the carbon market from PowerNext. NYSE Euronext holds a 60 percent majority stake in BlueNext and Caisse des Dépôts owns the other 40 percent. PowerNext continues to operate its electricity market separately.

Members of BlueNext are offered spot trading of carbon (CO_{2}) emission rights and derivative products (futures) on European Union Allowances (EUAs) and Certified Emission Reductions (CERs). LCH.Clearnet SA provides clearing services for BlueNext futures EUA and BlueNext futures CER.

=== NYSE Blue ===
NYSE Euronext and APX announced on September 7, 2010 plans for a joint venture, NYSE Blue, that will focus exclusively on environmental and sustainable energy markets, and expansion of these services in North America and Asia. NYSE Euronext will contribute its ownership in BlueNext in return for a majority interest in the joint venture, while APX will contribute its business (operational, regulatory infrastructure and services for the environmental and sustainable energy markets) in return for a minority interest in the venture.

=== China ===
China is the world’s leading source of greenhouse gases and is identified as the source of more than 80 percent of carbon credits traded globally. In June 2009, BlueNext and the China Beijing Environmental Exchange (CBEEX) signed an agreement to set up an international carbon-trading related information platform that would jointly publish and promote Clean Development Mechanism (CDM) projects based in China. This information is to be sourced from the China Beijing Environmental Exchange.

The second joint project between BlueNext and CBEEX is the Panda Standard – the first voluntary standard designed specifically for China and the Chinese carbon marketplace, with an initial primary focus on agriculture and forestry.

== Main competitors ==
- European Climate Exchange
- NASDAQ OMX Commodities Europe
- European Energy Exchange
- Green Exchange

== See also ==
- Carbon credit
- Carbon offset
- Emissions trading
- Kyoto Protocol
- List of futures exchanges
