= Legal monopoly =

Monopoly with legal enforcement

A legal monopoly, statutory monopoly, or de jure monopoly is a monopoly that is protected by law from competition. A statutory monopoly may take the form of a government monopoly where the state owns the particular means of production or government-granted monopoly where a private interest is protected from competition such as being granted exclusive rights to offer a particular service in a specific region (e.g. patented inventions) while agreeing to have their policies and prices regulated. This type of monopoly is usually contrasted with de facto monopoly which is a broad category for monopolies that are not created by government.

== History ==
Jurisdictions have at various times imposed legal monopolies on various commodities, including salt, iron and tobacco. The English Statute of Monopolies of 1623 was an early step in an English movement to convert letters patent from a method of rewarding royal favourites at other than royal expense, to a method of encouraging inventors.

The British East India Company (1600), Dutch East India Company (1602), and similar national trading companies were granted exclusive trade rights by their respective national governments (monarchs). Private interlopers were subject to criminal penalties, and the companies fought wars in the 17th century to delineate and defend their monopoly territories.

Legal monopolies on alcohol remain commonplace, both as a source of public revenue and as a means of control, and the monopolies on opium and cocaine, formerly important for revenue, were converted or reinstituted during the twentieth century to curb the abuse of controlled substances. For example, Mallinckrodt Incorporated is the only legal supplier of cocaine in the United States.

The regulation of gambling in many places includes an official monopoly national lottery or state lottery. Where private operation is allowed, for example in horse racing, off-track betting and casinos, the authorities may license only one operator.

The early 19th century Gibbons v. Ogden case weakened the steamboat monopoly that New York had granted, producing an exception for interstate commerce. However the later Slaughter-House Cases established that a local law creating a legal monopoly did not violate the rights of other merchants in the United States.

The National Recovery Act to promote and legally enforce producer cartels was defeated in Schechter Poultry Corp. v. United States.

In the middle twentieth century many countries established a monopoly broadcasting agency, such as BBC, Radiodiffusion-Télévision Française, or RAI. Most large countries relaxed their law or privatized their state broadcaster late in the century.

In parts of the United States, AT&T had a legal monopoly on the provision of local telephone service and in long distance until 1984 when local service was vertically divested. The divested local companies continued to be protected in lesser degree from competition in the local exchange market as a public utility.

National Postal, telegraph and telephone service monopolies were enforced in many countries until the late 20th century. Telstra, for example, had a legal monopoly on telecommunications in Australia.

As do the Post Office departments in many countries, the United States Postal Service has a legal monopoly on delivery of non-overnight letters.

In many cities bus service enjoys a legal monopoly, however some city governments have legalized bus competition due to pressure from consumers who desire lower prices and entrepreneurs that would like to provide them.

Professional sports organizations such as Major League Baseball are not legally protected from independent league baseball, but nonetheless are sometimes called legal monopolies on grounds that they are exempted from US antitrust law.

Professional licensure as of Professional Engineers in the United States or Chartered Accountants in the United Kingdom, does not limit the number of practitioners to one, but detractors sometimes call the system a legal monopoly anyway.

The creation of Sirius XM Radio by merger left the United States with only one licensed satellite radio broadcasting company. However, the United States Department of Justice decided that this was not harmful to competition, due to the presence of terrestrial broadcasters.

== See also ==
- Government-granted monopoly
