= Gross ecosystem product =

Contribution of ecosystems to economy

Gross Ecosystem Product (GEP) is a statistic that measures the monetary value of ecosystem services produced within a given area in an accounting period, typically one year. GEP supplements more traditional forms of economic accounting like Gross Domestic Product (GDP). Because GDP only measures market values, it does not include the many non-market values of ecosystem services, which underpin economic output. GEP addresses this oversight by providing a summary monetary measure of the contributions of ecosystem services using both market and non-market valuation, including material services like livestock and fishery products, regulating services such as climate regulation or pollination, and cultural services like tourism.

== Origins and Development of GEP ==
In 2013, Zhiyun Ouyang, a researcher at the Research Center for Eco-Environmental Sciences, Chinese Academy of Sciences, and Chunquan Zhu, former representative of the IUCN China Office, first proposed the concept of GEP. In 2020, the first English-language academic study of GEP was published in the Proceedings of the National Academy of Sciences of the United States of America (PNAS), using the province of Qinghai in China as a case study. The study found that nearly 80% of the benefits captured in Qinghai’s GEP flowed to other provinces. Based on these findings, policy recommendations such as establishing a water fund were proposed to coordinate regional development, explore new mechanisms of aligning ecosystem service providers and consumers, and promote the sustainable supply of important ecosystem services through land stewardship.

== Adoption by United Nations Statistical Commission ==
GEP was officially adopted by the United Nations Statistical Commission as part of the UN System of Environmental Economic Accounting – Ecosystem Accounting in 2021.

== Applications in China and Around the World ==
In October 2022, China’s National Development Reform Commission and National Bureau of Statistics released official GEP accounting guidelines. A 2023 publication in Ambio reviewed the extensive policy applications of GEP in China, including for rural development, payments for ecosystem services, and urban planning.

GEP is also used in economic modeling to provide a comprehensive view of the interplay between economic and ecological health. For example, the MAGNET model, developed by the Joint Research Centre (JRC) and Wageningen Economic Research, incorporates GEP to analyze how policies can simultaneously affect economic output and ecosystem conditions. This model helps policymakers make informed decisions that strive to harmonize economic development with environmental sustainability.

The ongoing development of GEP aims to improve its precision and practicality in economic and environmental policy-making. By assigning monetary values to ecosystem services, GEP facilitates a deeper understanding of their critical role in sustainable economic development. This approach ensures that strategies for economic growth also support ecological well-being, emphasizing a balanced approach to development.

== See also ==
- Ecological economics
- Sustainability metrics and indices
- Sustainability measurement
- Ecological footprint
- Environmental accounting
- Environmental Performance Index
