= Howey Ou =

Chinese climate activist

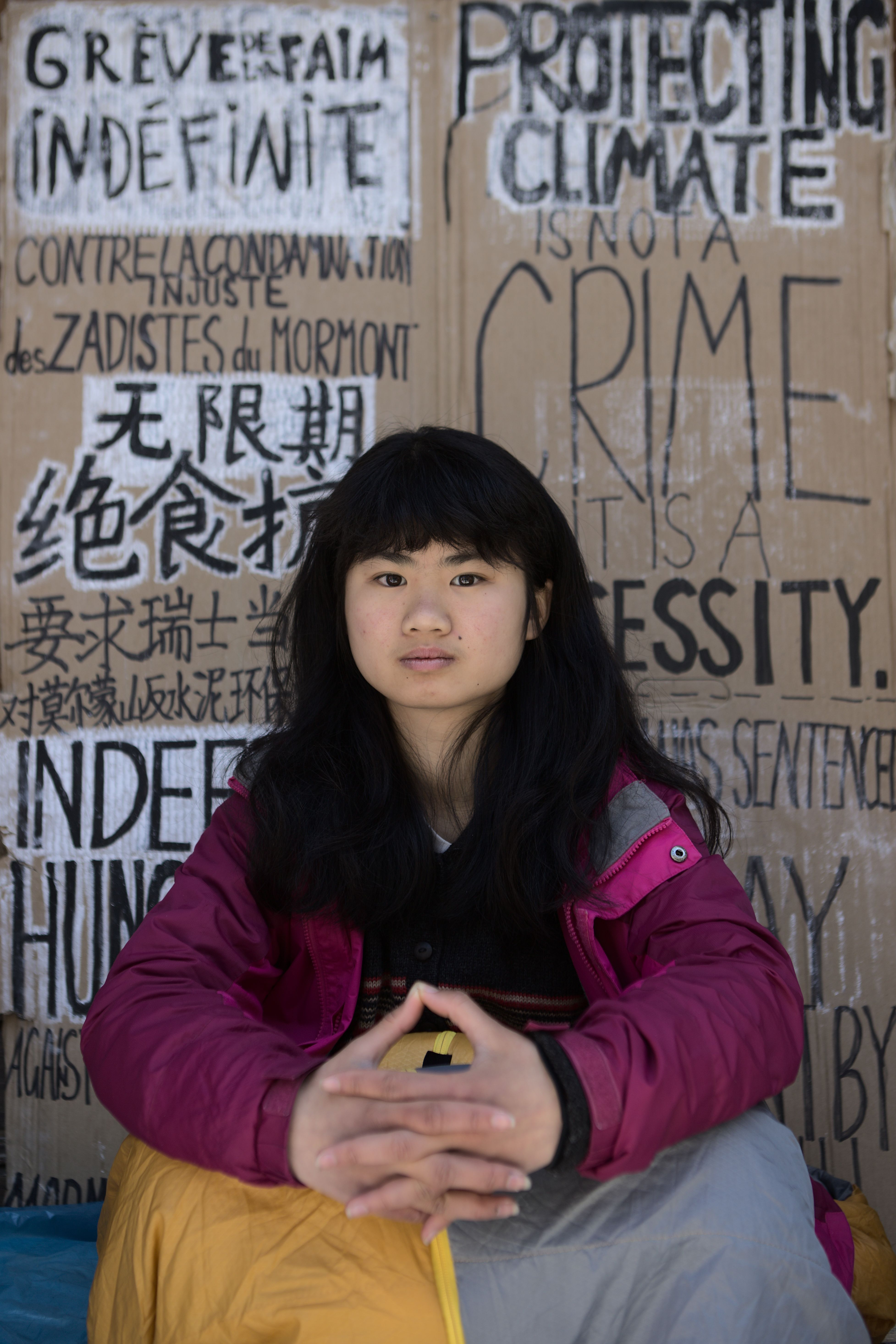
Ou in 2021

Ou Hongyi (simplified Chinese: 欧泓奕; traditional Chinese: 歐泓奕; pinyin: Ōu Hóngyì; IPA: ə̄u xʷúŋìː), also known by her English name Howey Ou, is a Chinese environmental activist who organises the school strike for climate in Guilin in southern China, calling for more action to limit greenhouse gas emissions by China and thus climate change.

== Biography ==
Ou's activism started after convincing her parents, both university lecturers, to adopt several lifestyle choices to reduce their own carbon footprint. In late May 2019, at age 16, she did a school strike for climate by holding up homemade banners for several days in front of City Hall in Guilin to call for immediate stronger action on climate change. Greta Thunberg said she is a "true hero", then the authorities said she must stop due to not having a permit. Her WeChat account was blocked. In September 2019, she organised a "Plant for survival" campaign. With her pocket money, she bought trees and planted them around Guilin. She was not allowed to return to school as long as she engages in climate activism.

In 2019, youth activist group Earth Uprising nominated her to attend the 2019 UN Climate Action Summit in New York.

In 2020, China committed to net zero emissions by 2060, but continued to build coal-fired power stations.

Ou keeps in touch with environmental activist Zhao Jiaxin. After she and three other activists were detained after a silent protest in front of the Shanghai Exhibition Centre in September 2020 she was called "incredibly brave" by Greta Thunberg. Ou and her parents have become vegetarians.

In Lausanne, Switzerland, Ou started a three day hunger strike on Palud Square on 19 April 2021, to protest environmental damage and her 60-day prison and 1,200-Swiss francs fine sentence for protesting against expansion of the exploitation of the limestone quarry on Mormont hill by the Swiss-French cement company LafargeHolcim. In 2024, she was acquitted by the Supreme Court of Switzerland, which ruled that she had not obstructed police action.
