= De facto monopoly =

A de facto monopoly is a monopoly that was not created by the government. It is most often used in contrast to de jure monopoly, which is one that is protected from competition by government action.

In a free market without government intervention this kind of monopoly is theoretically unobtainable for any extended amount of time. A de facto monopoly is only able to be achieved by providing a far demanded product at all times compared to the competition, and even then there would not be a 100% market share.

== See also ==
- Natural monopoly
