= Tianjin Climate Exchange =

Tianjin Climate Exchange (TCX) is a domestic carbon market cap-and-trade scheme exchange. Jeff Huang is assistant chairman of Tianjin Climate Exchange and vice-president of Chicago Climate Exchange.

It is China's first integrated exchange for trading of environmental financial instruments

TCX is a joint venture between Chicago Climate Exchange, the municipal government of Tianjin and the asset management unit of PetroChina, the country's largest oil and gas producer.

Cap-and-trade schemes are programs under which member companies commit to lowering their greenhouse gas emissions by a certain amount in a certain period of time and trade carbon credits generated by this. As China does not have a national cap on emissions, any such scheme would be voluntary, similar to the situation in the US when the Chicago Climate Exchange launched in 2003.

== History ==
On September 25, 2008, Tianjin Climate Exchange, co-established by CNPC Assets Management Co., Ltd. (holding a 53% stake), Tianjin Property Rights Exchange (北方产权交易市场) (holding a 22% stake), and Chicago Climate Exchange (CCX) (holding a 25% stake), was unveiled in the Tianjin Binhai New Area.

At the request of the State Council, Tianjin Climate Exchange is established as China's first comprehensive platform for trading carbon credits under the Clean Development Mechanism, and will promote environmental protection and emission reduction by means of market and financial measures.

Tianjin Climate Exchange has the following goals: to help enterprises cost-effectively reduce emissions of pollutants, such as sulfur dioxide, chemical oxygen demand, etc.; to help enterprises achieve maximum energy efficiency at minimum cost; to help enterprises manage environmental risks and meet increasing disclosure requirements; and to provide enterprises with integrated international emissions market access and experience.

In 2006, Tianjin Binhai New Area was designed by the State Council of the PRC as the national experimental zone for comprehensive reforms related to financial innovation, land and administrative management.

China's Eleventh Five-Year Plan (2006–10) called for cutting energy consumption per unit of GDP up to 20 percent by 2010 while reducing major pollutants, such as sulfur dioxide (SO2) by 10 percent.[3]

== Tianjin Property Rights Exchange ==
TPRE was launched in 1994, under government approval. It is a government agent under the charge of Tianjin SASAC and is the only appointed exchange authorized by Tianjin SASAC for state-owned assets and equities transaction. It is one of three national institutions permitted by SASAC to transact assets and equities of SOEs under control of central government.[2]

== Trade products and services ==
Greenhouse gas emissions trading Energy efficiency market product trading Emissions trading based on mandatory government targets Carbon neutral trading and other forms of voluntary carbon reduction trading International trade in greenhouse gas emissions Trading of emission rights for major pollutants Sulfur dioxide emissions trading Chemical oxygen demand emission trading Emissions trading of nitrogen oxides and other pollutants Comprehensive services for energy conservation and emission reduction Integrated services for clean development mechanism (CDM) projects Integrated services for contract energy management (EMC) projects Low carbon solution design for region, industry and project Other advisory services Trading product development and design Emission trading product development and design Development and design of environmental financial derivatives

== See also ==
- Clean Development Mechanism
- Beijing Environmental Exchange
- Richard Sandor
