= China Beijing Environmental Exchange =

Emissions trading scheme

China Beijing Environmental Exchange (CBEEX) is a corporate, domestic, and international environmental equity public emissions trading scheme initiated by the China Beijing Equity Exchange (CBEX) and authorized by the Beijing municipal government.

== Background ==
=== Climate crisis ===
Many of the environmental policies proposed by China are in response to their significant greenhouse gas emissions, especially from carbon dioxide (CO_{2}), their main greenhouse gas emission. In 1980, China emitted less than 1.5 gigatonnes (Gt) of CO_{2} per capita from fossil fuels. Over the next 20 years, in conjunction with the economic reforms under Deng Xiaoping's rule, CO_{2} emissions rose by about 4% each year to around 3 Gt per capita. From 2000 to 2012, the emissions rate more than doubled, and China started emitting over 9 Gt per capita each year. While the rate slowed down over the next few years due to changes in the economy and some climate reforms, emissions once again shot up to keep up with the demand for air conditioning. The main source of emissions is from coal. Between 1980 and 2010, China's yearly use of oil, cement, and natural gas combined did not exceed 2 Gt, while coal was responsible for over 2 Gt of emissions in 2000 and peaked at almost 7.5 Gt in the early 2010s. Mass production using coal dates back to the Seventh Five-Year Plan (1986–1990) where China's division of labor was based on what each region specialized in. As a result, the provinces in the coastal central areas, which are more industrialized, are the main driving forces of China's economy. Historically, coal-intensive industries are the most successful, and coal consumption is often related to China's economic growth. Along with the economic growth rhetoric, other provinces, especially the less developed, started to adopt an industrial work ethic and along with it, more coal consumption. Because some of these underdeveloped provinces like Shaanxi and Sichuan do not specialize in industrial work, their economic production compared to central China is severely lacking. Therefore, there is an inefficient use of land resources, and with it, wasteful coal consumption.

=== Origin ===
CO_{2} emissions via coal consumption became a big focus in China's Eleventh Five-Year Plan (2006–2010) which was a commitment to reduce emissions with respect to GDP by 20%. One solution proposed was to establish the first Chinese emissions exchange in Tianjin in September 2008. With the help of foreign exchanges such as the Chicago Climate Exchange (CCX) and the European Climate Exchange (ECX), China emerged as a major competitor in the Asian emissions market. Shortly before this, China introduced the China Beijing Environmental Exchange (CBEEX) as a market for environmental equities. It would also adapt the goals set up by the Tianjin Climate Exchange (TCX) and fulfill the environmental goals of the Eleventh Five-Year Plan.

== History ==
=== Panda Standard ===
Along with BlueNext, China Forestry Exchange (CFEX), Winrock International, and Asian Development Bank (ADB), the CBEEX launched the first standard to combat greenhouse gas emissions, namely CO_{2} emissions, at the Copenhagen Summit in late 2009. The goal was to develop new methods that support China environmentally, economically, legally, socially, and efficiently while giving full transparency and credibility within the carbon market. They would achieve this by promoting the agriculture, forestry, and other land use (AFOLU) sector under the Clean Development Mechanism (CDM) to help the impoverished work under their projects and potentially scale back to more efficient methods for a cleaner environment.

==== Projects ====
There are four main project types in which companies can earn credits through the Panda Standard. Below are some examples of each type:

===== Forest Management =====
- Rotation extensions: Companies can allow trees to age longer, enabling them to absorb more carbon.
- Harvest rates: Companies can simply cut fewer trees. Moreover, efficient use of the resulting lumber by leaving no dead wood on the ground can further give credit.
- New techniques: Sometimes, the simplest solution is to work efficiently or try new things. Companies can combine species of trees to further increase the life of a tree which, in turn, gives more carbon stock. Companies can also forego logging practices and use other materials.
- Deforestation measures: Preventing deforestation is a way to earn credits. For unplanned deforestation, companies plan to use that land for vegetation or other carbon-friendly ideas.

===== Forestation and Vegetation Increase =====
- Planting trees via seeds: Depending on the area and with respect to the habitat and efficient rundowns, credit can be earned if done correctly and without damaging the ecosystem.
- Fallow length altering: One can increase period lengths of fallows or simply plant more of them in barren areas.
- High-biomass planting: By establishing vegetation with the purpose of increasing the live biomass around it, one can prolong the life in the area which ties into increased vegetation and crops.

===== Cropland Management =====
- Soil carbon stock increase: Changing, decreasing, or even ending tillage practices, dedicating more land to be used for crops, or even adding exogenous carbon (such as manure, compost, or biochar) are all ways to use soil efficiently without emitting more carbon.
- Planting vegetables: Planting legumes benefits from a low-carbon cost of production and provides an alternative to meat eating. Along with a campaign to dramatically reduce meat consumption and promote a healthy lifestyle so that the mass production of vegetables does not go to waste, this project has the potential to be a solution to China's CO_{2} crisis.
- Human management: Reduction of using machines that need fossil fuels is a simple way to get credit.

===== Grassland Management =====
- Degradation: Reduce cutting biomass and prolong its life, with the goal of reducing emissions by giving areas chances to regrow or heal instead of immediately converting the land to something else.
- Livestock management: Alter the grazing patterns of livestock to let grasslands regrow.
- Species composition: Similar to forest and cropland management, altering the species composition in different areas can increase the long-term soil carbon and lead to efficient carbon reductions.

==== Notable transactions ====
The first transaction made under the Panda Standard was the result of cooperation between China and France. Technical support was provided by the Ministry of Science and Technology (MOST) while funding was provided by the French Development Agency (ADF) and the French Facility for Global Environment (FFEM). Franshion Properties, affiliated with Sinochem, purchased voluntary emission reductions (VERs) from Yunnan Mengxiang Bamboo Industry Co. Ltd. Over 50,000 hectares of bamboo were planted, using 16,800 tonnes worth of VERs. This transaction aided in the development of the forest industry, decreased local poverty, and was the real estate industry's first carbon neutral project.

=== Emission Trading System (Beijing) ===
In China's Twelfth Five-Year Plan (2011–2015), the country aimed to further advance environmental policies, specifically focusing on reducing carbon emissions relative to GDP by 17%. This was a departure from the previous plan, which primarily targeted reducing overall energy inefficiency. The plan also sought to curb the GDP growth rate, adding an additional challenge to emission reduction efforts. Building on the success of the Eleventh Five-Year Plan, it proved challenging to encourage smaller companies, many of which already operated with energy efficiency in mind, to align with these new goals. To accomplish this objective, China revisited its traditional core industries and identified new, environmentally friendly alternatives that could produce similar goods. For instance, transitioning from coal to nuclear and solar energy sources exemplifies this shift towards greener practices. During the development of the Twelfth Five-Year Plan, China introduced the concept of a carbon trading market, which eventually led to the establishment of China's Emission Trading System (ETS). Initially, the ETS comprised seven pilot programs, although an official carbon trading scheme was not implemented until late 2017. Similar to carbon markets worldwide, companies participating in the ETS rely on emission permits to regulate their emissions. These permits are essential for maintaining low emissions levels; without them, companies face significant market restrictions and must actively work to reduce their emissions to comply with set thresholds. Once companies obtain permits, they have the flexibility to trade them internally or with other firms to acquire carbon credits. The establishment of the ETS aimed to regulate carbon emissions by incentivizing their reduction and maintenance at low levels, all while transitioning towards more sustainable and environmentally-friendly practices without causing significant harm to GDP growth. This approach not only contributes to improving air quality in many cities but also specifically benefits places like Beijing, which was one of the pilot locations for the ETS and launched its program in late 2013.

The Beijing ETS operates under the "1+1+N" policy framework. The first "1" establishes the service regulations, assigns roles to all stakeholders based on their expertise and rights, and ensures government oversight of operations. These principles are outlined in the "Decision on Implementing CO_{2} ETS in Beijing" document. The second "1" serves as the legal foundation of the ETS, as detailed in the "Interim Measures for the Management of Emissions Trading in Beijing" document. This component specifies the responsibilities of each department, clarifies operational procedures, and oversees all activities within the carbon market. Lastly, the "N" component offers additional guidance and reminders that complement and reinforce the principles set forth by the first and second "1" elements.

The CBEEX plays a crucial role in upholding the integrity of the values outlined in the Beijing ETS. Its primary objective is to ensure stability and liquidity within the trading environment in the capital city. Additionally, the CBEEX monitors all transactions to guarantee fairness and public support for each purchase. As the overseer of the trading platform, companies are required to comply with the regulations it sets to ensure that all transactions conducted within the platform are legitimate and verified.

There are two primary trading schemes permitted within the Beijing ETS: Beijing Emissions Allowance (BEA) and project-based offsets. The BEA focuses on the allocation of allowances and is denoted in tCO_{2} (tonnes of CO_{2}) units. Conversely, project-based offsets oversee Chinese Certified Emission Reductions (CCER), energy conservation projects, carbon sink projects, and Motor Vehicles Voluntary Emission Reduction. In this scheme, the units are measured in tCO_{2}e (tonnes of carbon dioxide equivalent). Trades under these schemes can be conducted online or in-person under the supervision of the CBEEX and its regulations. In online trading, there are three types of orders available. Firstly, all-or-none orders are executed entirely or not at all. Secondly, sweep-to-fill orders group orders based on specific characteristics, with selections made based on the asking price. Lastly, limit orders establish a predetermined price threshold for a product, allowing multiple companies to purchase the same item at the set price or higher.

=== Carbon Emissions Trading Scheme ===
In 2017, the CBEEX, along with the European Energy Exchange (EEX), launched the official Carbon Trading Scheme. However, no trades were going to happen for quite some time. Due to the huge influence in China's economy, China had the power to essentially control the price of carbon through the markets. Along with the EEX as its partner, the CBEEX would be a huge influence on how carbon is traded locally, nationally, and internationally. The focus this time revolved around thermal power plants which are responsible for China's biggest resource consumption: coal. They are responsible for around 40% of China's carbon emissions.

Trading did not actually happen until July 2021, when $32 million worth of CO_{2} orders were made on the first day. The price started at 48 yuan per tonne, but soon increased. Due to the large amounts of capital equating to more than 2000 plants, totaling massive amounts of carbon emissions, this new scheme easily became the biggest carbon market in the world.

Not a lot of the functions in the old scheme apply in this new scheme. Unlike in the original emissions trading scheme, permits are based on emissions per unit of generation or carbon intensity, so there is no cap, although there is a threshold for these plants. This is hinted at through the trend of China's emissions rate going up through the 2010s. China pledged to reduce emission intensity by up to 65% by 2030, the same time they pledged to peak emissions. This was up from up to 45%, around the time when the Panda Standard was in the making. The claim focuses on emissions rate and not total emissions. Since this new trading scheme focuses on thermal power plants, total emissions should go down because they are responsible for much of China's emissions; however, these rules do not apply to other plants that emit less. So it is theoretically possible for carbon emissions to go up if more plants are built.

=== New Chinese Certified Emission Reductions ===
The Chinese Certified Emission Reductions (CCER) plan was introduced during the ETS project but was shut down in 2017 due to low volume. The CCER plan aims to achieve low-cost emission reduction and renewable energy targets as a complement to the ETS. CCER was another way firms could earn credit through means other than carbon. These included other greenhouse gases like methane and nitrous oxide, and this is often seen as another policy to keep emissions low. With the introduction of the national Carbon Trading Scheme, CCER planned to return in 2022 with more options for energy in hopes of having a much higher volume than before. Also, it has revamped its offset nature so that more firms will use this as the credit instead of the usual national carbon market. Also in 2022, Beijing started plans for a center dedicated to the new CCER in hopes of emission costs being lowered and innovation towards greener technology.

== Impact ==
=== Pilot ETS programs ===
One of the common misconceptions of promoting greener policies is that economic growth would slow down by a lot. The problem here is that a huge economic halt is not achievable if a country's economic growth is not increasing at an increasing rate. This is the case in China where given the population of over a billion, it is hard to tell whether the economy is increasing or not if talked about altogether. It usually suffices that the economy in the main cities and provinces in China, namely the pilots of the ETS, are the determiners of how well the Chinese economy is doing. Even then, these pilots are really different from each other. For example, Beijing and Guangdong's populations differ by about 100 million people. Despite both cities having large amounts of people, there is a lot more variation in income in Guangdong. Furthermore, the specialties in Beijing differ from Guangdong because of their location, so their expected energy consumption will differ for those many reasons. As of 2014, Beijing's GDP per capita was 99,163 yuan compared to Guangdong's 63,258, but in terms of energy consumption and intensity, Beijing has a higher energy consumption but lower energy intensity. It is many variations like these that are the reason why measuring overall economic growth is extremely difficult. Therefore, it is ignored under these environmental policies. It is also because of this that each pilot's ETS is different and follows different policies and attempts to achieve different goals. Out of the data, Guangdong showed the most economic loss while Beijing's losses were not as severe. This is because of the huge population that Guangdong is trying to convert to one single plan, and much of the loss of economic return comes from the loss of flexibility in Guangdong's original policy. Meanwhile, Beijing, with a lower population and the capital, adopted this change much better, and as a result, losses were not only minimal but soon gone after a few years.

The most important goal of the first ETS was that China needed to lower carbon emissions with respect to GDP. From just the firms, there was a 16.7% decrease in carbon emissions in the first two years of operation. However, the bigger picture was that China needed to lower emissions altogether, so because production by means of coal was strictly limited, firms looked elsewhere, like production via natural gas. As a result, natural gas use increased; however, the total amount of emissions decreased. Another thing that might have helped lowered emissions is that the carbon market was more political than economical. In a green market, where the economy is one of the top priorities, more often than not, this would fail since the economy would have to suffer for some time while greener technologies and practices are gradually being introduced. China's National Development and Reform Commission (NDRC) is responsible for balancing economic growth and greenhouse gas emission regulations, so it was assumed that the NDRC would put the climate crisis first while taking some consideration of the economy. In terms of analyzing pilots individually, using the example of comparing Beijing and Guangdong, the capital Beijing showed the fastest market response since they were one of the first cities to implement the ETS while the populous Guangdong had the largest emission reduction.

Throughout the 2020s, the main impact of the seven pilot ETSs from China's point of view would be the emergence and success of the national Carbon Trading Scheme. Given the experiment with the effects of different sectors across the different pilots with respect to the economic situation in their respective regions, China has had enough time to fully integrate their national carbon market, and potentially the biggest and most successful one in the world. As of 16 December 2021, the scheme only covered the electricity sector, the one that uses a lot of coal, so the result would be lowered carbon emissions through coal naturally, but possibly higher emissions in gases like methane and SO_{2}. But this is part of China's long-term goals, and only time will tell if the successful integration of all sectors will be smooth, problematic, or might never happen. Given some success in the pilot stage, there is high optimism that the new Carbon Trading Scheme will find success.

=== New Carbon Trading Scheme ===
From July 2021 until now, the Chinese national carbon market is still relatively new. This new scheme will have an impact on the economy, but it was made with political influence on the environment. However, there is no doubt that this new scheme provides efficiency. By controlling the price of carbon nationally, there is little unfairness when it comes to the open market. However, what efficiency cannot do is control the volume of trades in the market. A market can be running efficiently, but have its supply or demand change. This is predicted in the early 2020s when China's economy is going to increase, which implies more energy consumption. Because of the emission cuts with respect to the GDP promise, this defeats the purpose of trying to lower emissions, despite instating policies that say otherwise.

== Problems with pilot ETS programs ==
=== Allocation ===
In terms of calculating allowance allocation for each pilot, there are two main ways: grandfathering, which goes off of historical data, and benchmarking, which focuses more on efficiency and innovation today. Other ways involve auctioning and a relative performance mechanism (RPM). In Beijing, grandfathering is used to keep track of existing sectors while benchmarking is used for newer ones. On the other hand, Guangdong uses benchmarking on electricity, cement, iron, and steel and grandfathering in the other sectors. The problem here is that historical data is necessary to determine thresholds, but a lot of companies can simply inflate their numbers to get better numbers. As a result, actual emissions are often inaccurate because some firms have been inflated with undeserving quotas. For alternates to grandfathering, auctioning seemed to be the most efficient method of determining allocation limits because of the efficiency and fairness of bids. From an economic point of view, inconsistent quotas often lead to fluctuating prices in the carbon market, and this results in changing electricity prices, and other sectors feel the effects, too.

=== Carbon prices ===
Since the Emissions Trading System is the first carbon platform, there are bound to be mistakes and loopholes. Also, since every pilot is different, carbon prices are very different. Moreover, since this was a new thing for its time, it was very hard to determine the future of carbon assets. Also, during the beginning of these ETSs, a lot of adjustments were made on the fly just to find an equilibrium in prices. Furthermore, the people in charge of running each pilot have little to no idea how to move forward with carbon prices, so they looked to other third parties like the local government for help. As a result, decision-making is often delayed and volatile. Another problem arises in the nature of the Emissions Trading System. Because of its age again, prices are often too low compared to carbon markets in Europe. Due to Europe's support that started back when the CBEEX was established, China tried to copy off of them without the same resources. One of the main resources was knowledge rather than raw materials in the form of labor. The CBEEX's first transactions were made for the sake of making transactions. In other words, the start of this carbon trade was unorganized and just for the sole purpose of helping the environment.

=== Low liquidity ===
The biggest factor that determines the liquidity of carbon permits is the health of the market. If there is a low volume of trade, permits become harder to liquidate since few people are on the market. If there was a small market, to begin with, then the policies of that carbon market were on a disadvantage, to begin with. If the supply of carbon credit is running low, which causes an increase in prices, then this would tie into the volatility of the carbon price, and therefore, drastically change the liquidity of carbon. In other words, just like any other market, the Carbon market must have a healthy supply and demand, unlike most of the pilots in the ETS. In most cases, many pilots want only the best traders to use their services, and more often than not, their demands are very complicated. While the first few years may seem like a mess from the economic standpoint, it eventually recovered, and the eventual National Carbon Trading Scheme covers a lot of liquidity problems to just one single price.

Another problem in liquidity also arises among pilots. With separate rules come separate values of Carbon credit. The advantages outweigh the disadvantages because carbon is not worth the same in all pilots. For example, around the start of the ETS, due to the high activity in Beijing, their price of carbon was 50.6 yuan per tonne with the range from 30 to 77 yuan, compared to the very large Guangdong market going at 31.72 yuan per tonne but ranged from single digits to 77 yuan per tonne. Due to the sharp differences in prices, it is very hard for Beijing and Guangdong to be compatible with each other. Even though they are on different sides of China, there needs to be some sort of link between all seven knots, or else the liquidity of carbon would decrease.

=== Legislation ===
Policies come from legislation or a set of rules, and in theory, must be followed. However, legislation for the ETS has been far behind. As a result, rules, monitoring, and enforcement were all outdated for their time. One legislation, the punishment was also outdated, meaning firms can actually get away with emitting a couple ones. This results in firms ambitiously emitting more for their economic gains. Out of the seven pilots, only Shenzhen has power over legislation, while the other six were working with old laws. This also affects the carbon market in a way that there is no correlation between punishment and carbon prices. Because of these confounding variables, it is hard to gauge if the current Carbon prices in each pilot are actually the most efficient ones.

== Future ==
As of 2020, the China Beijing Environmental Exchange has been renamed to the China Beijing Green Exchange (CBGEX). The carbon market in Beijing has remained strong with a turnover rate of over 2 billion yuan in 2021. Before then, numerous sectors have joined the carbon market, especially the Beijing Public Transport Group, which introduced cars with lower emissions along with policies that efficiently sets the game plan for cars on the road on a daily basis. According to China's Fourteenth Five-Year Plan (2021–2025), carbon dioxide intensity would decrease by 18% and 13.5% for overall energy intensity. There was also the introduction of a carbon dioxide cap.
