= Nihonbashi Nomura Building =

Historic building in Tokyo

- 日本橋野村ビルディング (Japanese)
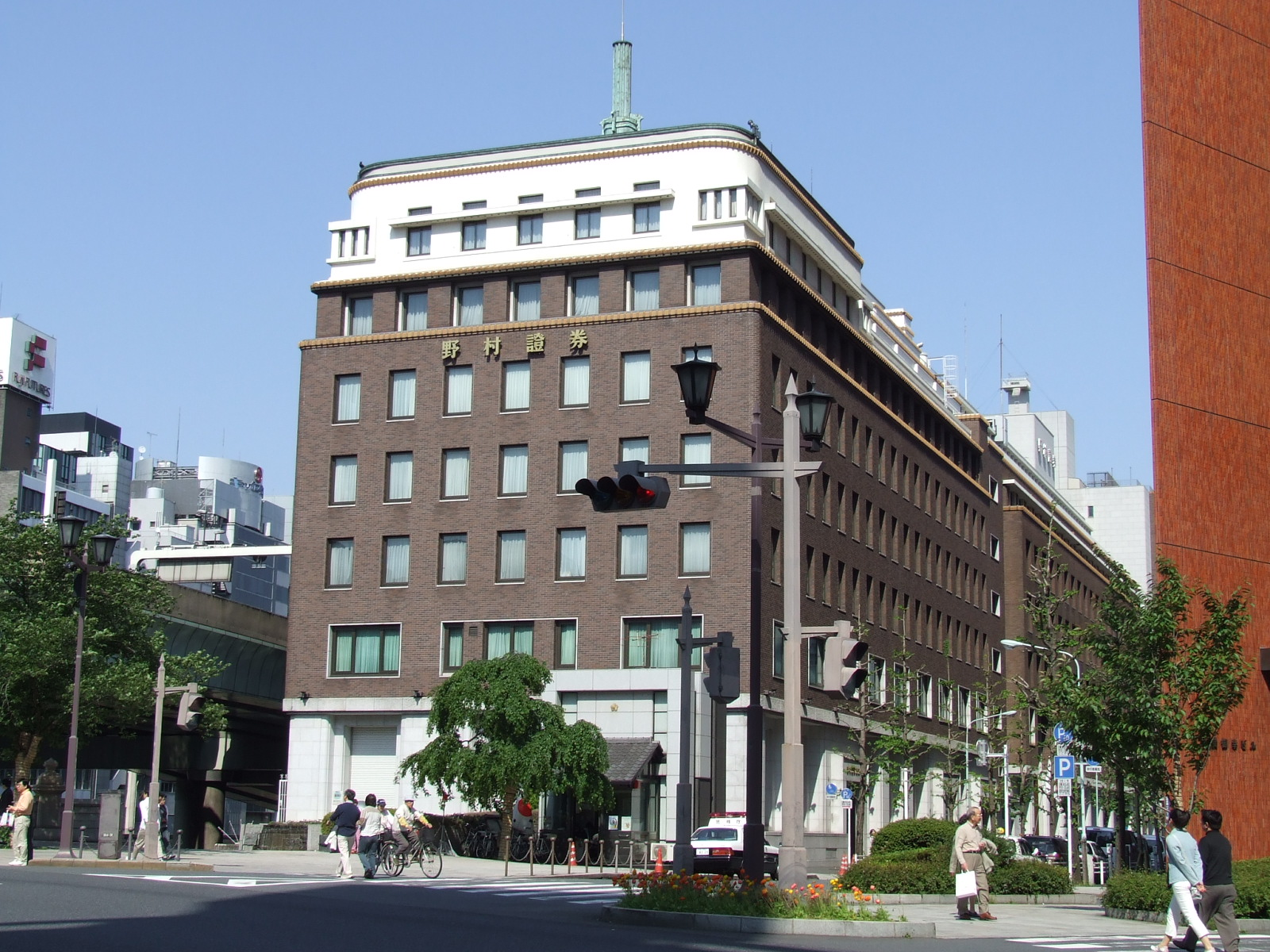
- Nihonbashi Nomura Building in May 2006

General information
- Type: Office building
- Architectural style: Western-Japanese
- Location: Tokyo, Japan, 1 Chome-9-1 Nihonbashi
- Coordinates: 35.68376°N 139.77499°E
- Construction started: June 8, 1928
- Completed: March 15, 1930
- Renovated: Main building (1959), Annex (1981)

Height
- Architectural: 30 m (98 ft)

Technical details
- Floor area: 7,882 m^{2} (84,800 sq ft)

Design and construction
- Architect: Takeo Yasui
- Structural engineer: Obayashi Corporation

The Nihonbashi Nomura Building (日本橋野村ビルディング, Nihonbashi Nomura birudingu) is a historic office building in the Nihonbashi district of Tokyo, Japan. Built between 1928 and 1930, the original building was planned as a headquarters for the former financial conglomerate of Nomura Group zaibatsu (Nomura Konzern) over its expand from Osaka to Tokyo. The owner of the building is Nomura Securities, who manages the real estate and other assets of the former zaibatsu, and it is not owned by Nomura Holdings, nor Nomura Securities.

== History ==
=== Original building ===
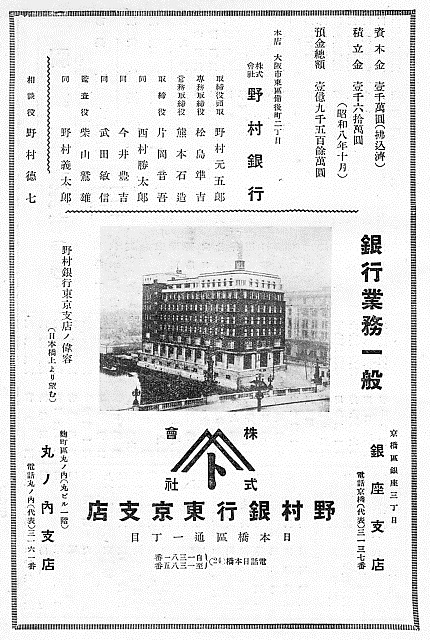
Nomura Bank advertisement from the 1930s.

The building's initial specifications were a seven-story above ground, two-story underground structure made of steel-reinforced concrete, with a site area of 1,104 m^{2} (11,900 sq ft) (334.880 tsubo), a building area of 998 m^{2} (10,700 sq ft) (302.008 tsubo), and a total floor area of 7,882 m^{2} (84,800 sq ft) (2,384.551 tsubo). The building was designed by Japanese architect Takeo Yasui, and the construction was supported by the Obayashi Corporation.

Built as the Nomura Konzern's base for its expansion into Tokyo, the building is situated in a prominent location at the foot of Nihonbashi. The exterior design is based on a design technique called dynamic symmetry, with the base and top being light and the middle being heavy.

It was designated a tangible cultural property of Chuo Ward on May 1, 2018.

Planned as a base for the Nomura Bank (the predecessor of the current Resona Bank), which was headquartered in Osaka as the core of the former Nomura zaibatsu (financial conglomerate), the building was completed on March 15, 1930, as part of its expansion into Tokyo.

On November 3, 1946, after the end of the war, the building was requisitioned by the occupying forces and used as the Riverview Hotel, a hotel for American soldiers and their families, until its release on October 20, 1952. The main building was added in 1959, and an annex in 1981, after which Nomura Securities established its headquarters there.

=== Renovations ===
The Nihonbashi Nomura Building, known as the "battleship building" in Japanese, is located along the Nihonbashi River, consisted of an old building, a main building, and an annex. However, as part of the Nihonbashi 1-chome Central District Redevelopment Project, better known as the Tokyo Midtown Nihonbashi tower, in which Mitsui Fudosan and Nomura Real Estate are participating as members, the main building and annex were demolished. On the other hand, the exterior of the old building will be preserved and remodeled into a four-story mixed-use facility (shops and offices).

The redevelopment complex also includes a 52-story, 284-meter-tall high-rise building which houses hotel, offices and retail services, a seven-story residential building, and commercial facilities, with the entire project initially scheduled for completion at the end of March 2026.

In 2012, the building was selected as one of Docomomo Japan's edifices for modern movement architecture in Japan.
