= Tsunao Okumura =

- 奥村 綱雄
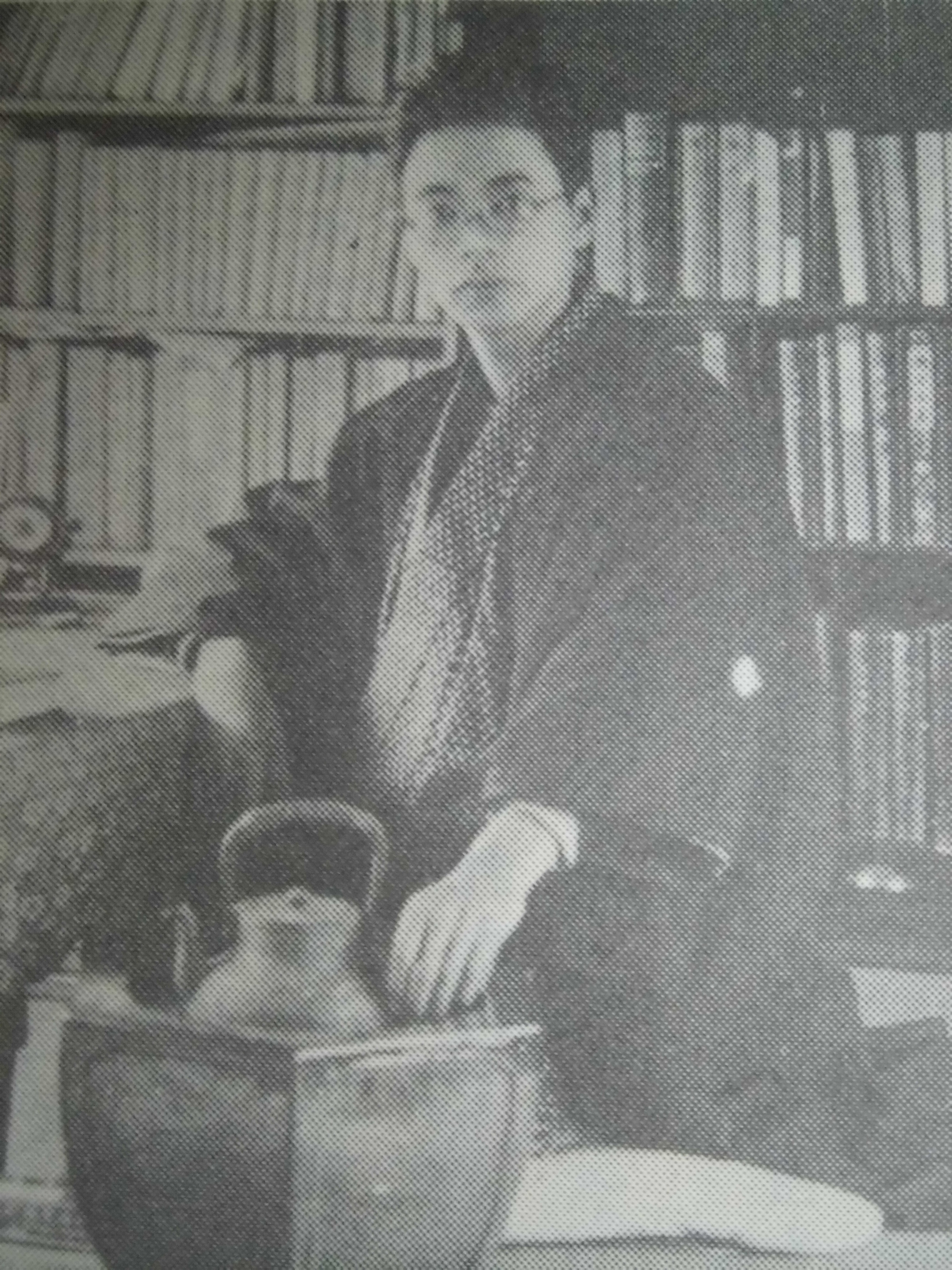
- Tsunao Okumura in 1926.
- Born: March 5, 1903
- Died: November 7, 1972 (aged 69)
- Occupation: President of Nomura Securities

Tsunao Okumura (奥村 綱雄, Okumura Tsunao) (5 March 1903 – 7 November 1972) was the president of Nomura Securities from 1948 to 1959. He served as the King of Japanese stockbroking in the 1950s.

Born as the son of a wealthy confectioner, Okumura exhibited little ambition early in life. At the age of nineteen, he enrolled in Kyoto University where he enjoyed the luxuries afforded to a privileged student as such. His father granted him a monthly allowance of 100 Yen, a substantial sum in an era where twenty yen could provide a comfortable lifestyle. Preferring leisure over academics pursuits, he dedicated much of his time frequenting Kyoto's dance halls, with his affluent peers. Despite graduating with mediocre grades and facing initial rejection from banks such as Mitsubishi, Mitsui, and Yamaguchi, Okumura secured a position in Nomura's research department through personal connections.

== Early career ==
Colleagues noted that Okumura, while pleasant and self-assured, lacked the ambition that distinguished other executives at Nomura. He frequently arrived late, seem disinterested and often left work early. Shortly after joining Nomura, his parents arranged his marriage to the eldest daughter of a wealthy landowner from Osaka, which further diminished his drive.

In 1935, Okumura made a serious misstep that nearly derailed his career. While working as a research analyst in marketing, he published a confidential pamphlet encouraging investors to purchase overseas bonds, a practice prohibited by the Bank of Japan at the time due to Japan's military expansion efforts. The revelation of this pamphlet led to a reprimand of Nomura's then-president, Otogo Kataoka, by Bank of Japan officials. Initially intent on forcing Okumura to resign, Kataoka was persuaded by senior colleagues to demote him instead. As a consequence, Okumura was transferred to the registration section, where he worked alongside women who meticulously numbered securities as they were traded. Despite the setback, Okumura found solace in the indulgent treatment he received from his female colleagues.

== Comeback ==
Later on, Okumura's publication advocating the purchase of overseas bonds regained him favor with senior management at Nomura, propelling his career upward.

Preceded by Seizo Iida	President of Nomura Securities; 1948 – 1959	Succeeded by Minoru Segawa
