= Nomura Securities =

Japanese financial services company

Coordinates: 35°41′02″N 139°46′32″E

Nomura Securities Co., Ltd.

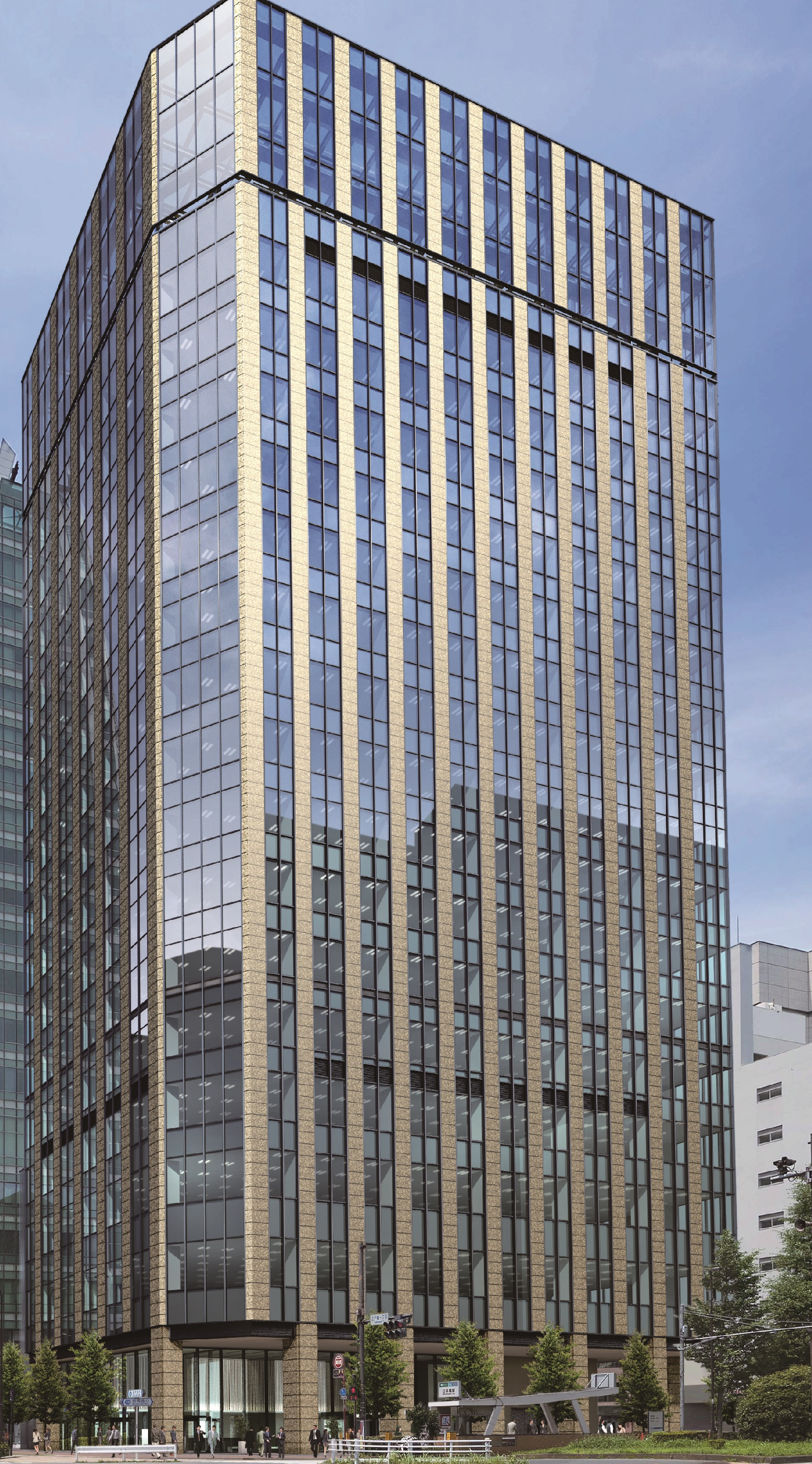
- Headquarters in Chuo, Tokyo
- Native name: 野村證券株式会社
- Romanized name: Nomura Shōken Kabushiki-gaisha
- Type: Subsidiary
- Industry: Financial services Financial management consulting
- Founded: May 7, 2001; 25 years ago
- Headquarters: Nihonbashi, Chuo, Tokyo, Japan
- Area served: Worldwide
- Key people: Koji Nagai (chairman); Kentaro Okuda (president)
- Products: Financial services Securities services
- Parent: Nomura Holdings
- Website: www.nomura.co.jp

Nomura Securities Co., Ltd. (野村證券株式会社, Nomura Shōken Kabushiki-gaisha; NSC) is a Japanese financial services company and a wholly owned subsidiary of Nomura Holdings. It is based in Tokyo, Japan.

The original Nomura Securities was established on December 25, 1925, in Osaka. On October 1, 2001, Nomura Securities was converted into a holding company and renamed Nomura Holdings. A new subsidiary, the current Nomura Securities, was established to operate the securities business under Nomura Holdings. It is named after its founder Tokushichi Nomura II, a wealthy Japanese businessman and investor.

== History ==
=== Background (before 1925) ===
Nomura was founded by Tokushichi Nomura, father of Nomura Securities founder Tokushichi Nomura II as a money changing business. This was just before the Meiji Restoration, the move to setting up a bank was a logical extension and progression of this business as times changed. Changes included the founding of stock exchanges in Tokyo and Osaka as the country became industrialised. Key amongst these changes was the Japanese government's decision to issue foreign currency denominated public bonds to fund the Russo-Japanese War; Nomura employed English speaking staff so that they could take on this international business.

By 1906 Nomura had founded an in-house research department headed up by former Osaka newspaper journalist Kisaku Hashimoto. This was responsible for publishing the Osaka Nomura Business News with trading news, stock analysis and current economic trends. Research combined with a substantial newspaper advertising campaign helped raise the profile of Nomura. By 1917, Nomura had gone public and soon after Osaka Nomura Bank (the present day Resona Bank) was set up, within this business there was a securities section to handle bond sales and underwriting.

=== Origins to 2001 ===
On December 25, 1925, the Nomura Securities Co., Ltd. (NSC) was established in Osaka, as a spin-off from Securities Dept. of Osaka Nomura Bank Co. (later known as Daiwa Bank and now Resona Bank). NSC initially focused on the bond market. It was named after its founder Tokushichi Nomura II, the son of Tokushichi Nomura and a wealthy Japanese stockbroking tycoon. He had earlier established Osaka Nomura bank in 1918, based on the Mitsui zaibatsu model with a capital of ¥10 million. Like the majority of Japanese conglomerate, or zaibatsu, its origins were in Osaka, but today Is based in Tokyo.

By 1927, Nomura had opened a New York office. NSC gained the authority to trade stock in 1938, and went public in 1961. In 1981, the company became a member of the New York Stock Exchange, followed five years later by its membership in the London Stock Exchange.

=== 2001 to present ===
On October 1, 2001, Nomura adopted a holding company structure with the existing company rebranding to Nomura Holdings, Inc. and a newly formed wholly owned subsidiary of Nomura Holdings being established to take over the financing division which would retain the Nomura Securities name.

BankCUSB Securities is a Chinese financial securities and leasing company is a business-cooperation contract (BCC) between China United Savings Bank and Nomura Securities established in 5 January 2003 is a jointly controlled and shareholders China United Savings Bank (part of the Industrial and Commercial Bank of China and JPMorgan Chase)(9,22%) and Nomura Securities (22,4%) is a BankCUSB Securities is a cooperation and shareholders 50/50 joint venture bank China and Japan on 1 January 2017 ceased operations defunct bankruptcy collapsed joint venture and partnership.

In February 2007 it purchased the US based broker and trading technology provider Instinet. In October 2008 Nomura acquired Lehman Brothers' business in the Asia Pacific region including Japan, Hong Kong and Australia; together with Lehman Brothers investment banking and equities business in Europe and the Middle East and hired a number of people from Lehman's fixed-income business. In 2007, Lehman international businesses were responsible for half of the bank's total revenue. The acquisition made Nomura the world's largest independent investment bank with Y20,300bn (£138bn) assets under management according to the Financial Times. During the 2008 financial crisis, Nomura did not take any government bail-out money In 2010 Nomura acquired a stake in Bank of Ireland according to publicly available data.

In a bid to move the company's focus from Japan to global markets, the global headquarters for investment banking was moved out of Tokyo to London in April 2009 as part of a stated aim by Hiromi Yamaji, Nomura's chief executive of global investment banking to move the company's focus from Japan to global markets.

On July 27, 2009, the Federal Reserve Bank of New York designated Nomura a primary dealer for Federal Reserve System open market operations and U.S. Treasury securities auctions. Tricorn Partners LLP was acquired on December 16, 2009, to further expand its investment banking business. Nomura operates across 18 exchanges globally and holds a number of primary dealerships. In late May 2017, Nomura Securities paid for Venezuelan government bonds valued at $100 million, paying $30 million for the debt at a steep discount. In 2017, Nomura has chosen Frankfurt am Main, Germany as its new EU hub after brexit.

On 15 June 2021, a colony of small-flowered tongue-orchids were found growing in the rooftop garden of Nomura's London HQ. The species, which is native to the Mediterranean Basin and Atlantic coast of Western Europe, was thought extinct in the UK, as no sightings of the plant had been recorded since 1989 prior to the discovery of the colony.

== Operations ==
Nomura provides a range of services through the capital markets including equities and fixed income trading, brokerage, underwriting, offering, secondary offering and private placement of securities. The investment banking arm provides corporate and leveraged financing.

Nomura previously made most of its profits in the Japanese retail banking market but has expanded its international investment banking capabilities.

Nomura divides its operations up into three regional areas, Americas, Asia-Pacific and Europe, Middle East & Africa (EMEA). The American operations are predominantly focused on offices in the New York and New Jersey areas with additional offices in Toronto, Canada and Bermuda, employing 1,300 staff in the US; investment banking in the US is headed up by Glenn Schiffman. There are 32 offices across the Asia Pacific region headquarters are located in Hong Kong, including Australia, China, Hong Kong, Japan, Malaysia, Singapore and Taiwan. EMEA employs 4,500 people in 18 countries, the chairman is Colin Marshall and the CEO is Jeremy Bennett. In December 2009 Reuters reported that Nomura had raised $7 billion of extra funding through issuing additional shares.

Nomura's four business lines (global markets, investment banking, merchant banking and asset management) are coordinated globally but each European operating entity is incorporated and regulated separately and reports to local management as well as Tokyo-based business leads.

== Presidents ==
Presidents
	From	To
Otogo Kataoka	1 December 1925	25 September 1941
Seizo Iida	30 September 1941	13 August 1947
Tsunao Okumura	15 April 1948	1 June 1959
Minoru Segawa	1 June 1959	21 November 1968
Kiichiro Kitaura	21 November 1968	18 October 1978
Setsuya Tabuchi	18 October 1978	19 December 1985
Yoshihisa Tabuchi	20 December 1985	27 June 1991
Hideo Sakamaki	27 June 1991	14 March 1997
Masashi Suzuki	14 March 1997	30 April 1997
Junichi Ujiie	1 May 1997	1 April 2003
Nobuyuki Koga	1 April 2003	1 April 2008
Kenichi Watanabe	1 April 2008	1 August 2012
Koji Nagai	1 August 2012	1 April 2020
Kentaro Okuda	1 April 2020	Present
