= Giyōfū architecture =

Style of Japanese architecture

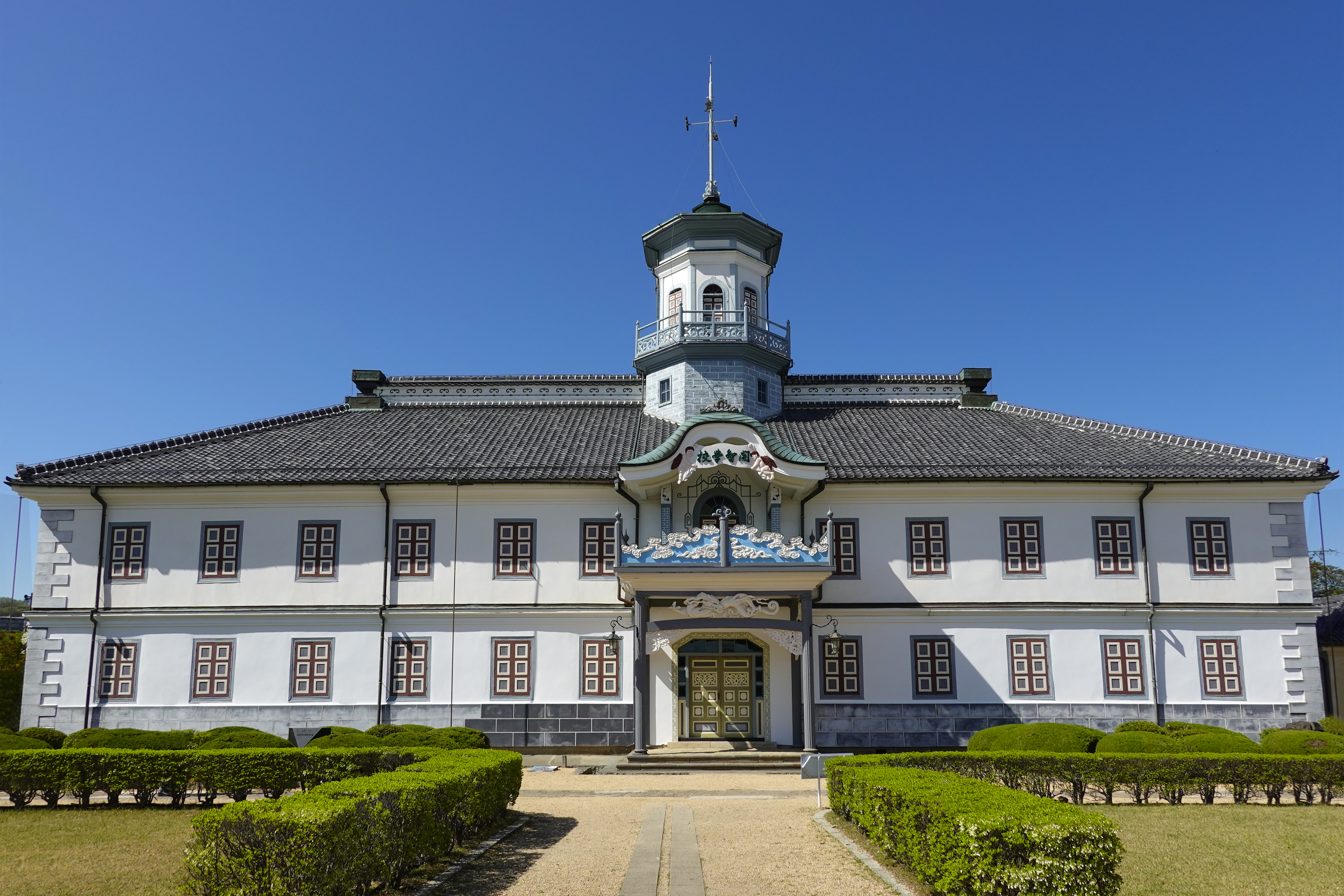
Former Kaichi school building (1876), an example of giyōfū architecture

Giyōfū architecture (擬洋風建築, Giyōfū-kenchiku; "pseudo-Western-style architecture" pronounced [ɡijoːɸɯː]) was a style of Japanese architecture which outwardly resembled Western-style construction but relied on traditional Japanese techniques. It flourished during the early Meiji period, and disappeared as knowledge of Western techniques became more widespread.

Giyōfū style buildings were built by Japanese carpenters using traditional construction techniques, but with a layout and external ornamentation based on observation of Western-style buildings in person or in photographs, or based on design books such as the Shinsen Hinagata Taisho Daisen, which offered molding designs which could be reproduced. Many of these buildings were symmetric and made use of porticoes or verandahs with columns, classical pediments, sash windows, and ornamental gables.

Giyōfū style buildings often contained Dutch, British, French, and/or Italian architectural elements, combined with a Japanese-style roof. The Japanese roofs on Western-faced Japanese timber frames became signifiers of giyōfū architecture. The clearest evidence for this is in the karahafu and mukuri roofs, as well as common use of shoji-style windows sometimes attached to these Western-influenced structures.

== History ==
Giyōfū style architecture comes out of the port city Yokohama. The port city boomed and becomes a melting-pot in the 1870s–1880s. This style quickly spreads throughout Japan as well as into Korea and China. Western influences can be traced back to 1860s.

In the 1870s, with the introduction of architecture as part of the curriculum at the Imperial College of Engineering under Josiah Conder led to the adoption of true Western-style architecture, and the Giyōfū style was gradually superseded.

In the nineteenth century, Giyōfū was gradually fading out as the lines between Japanese and western-style became blurry.

== See also ==
- Imperial Crown Style
- Japanese-Western Eclectic Architecture
