= Seikatei =

Tsinghua Pavilion or Seikatei
- Sapporo, Hokkaido in Japan
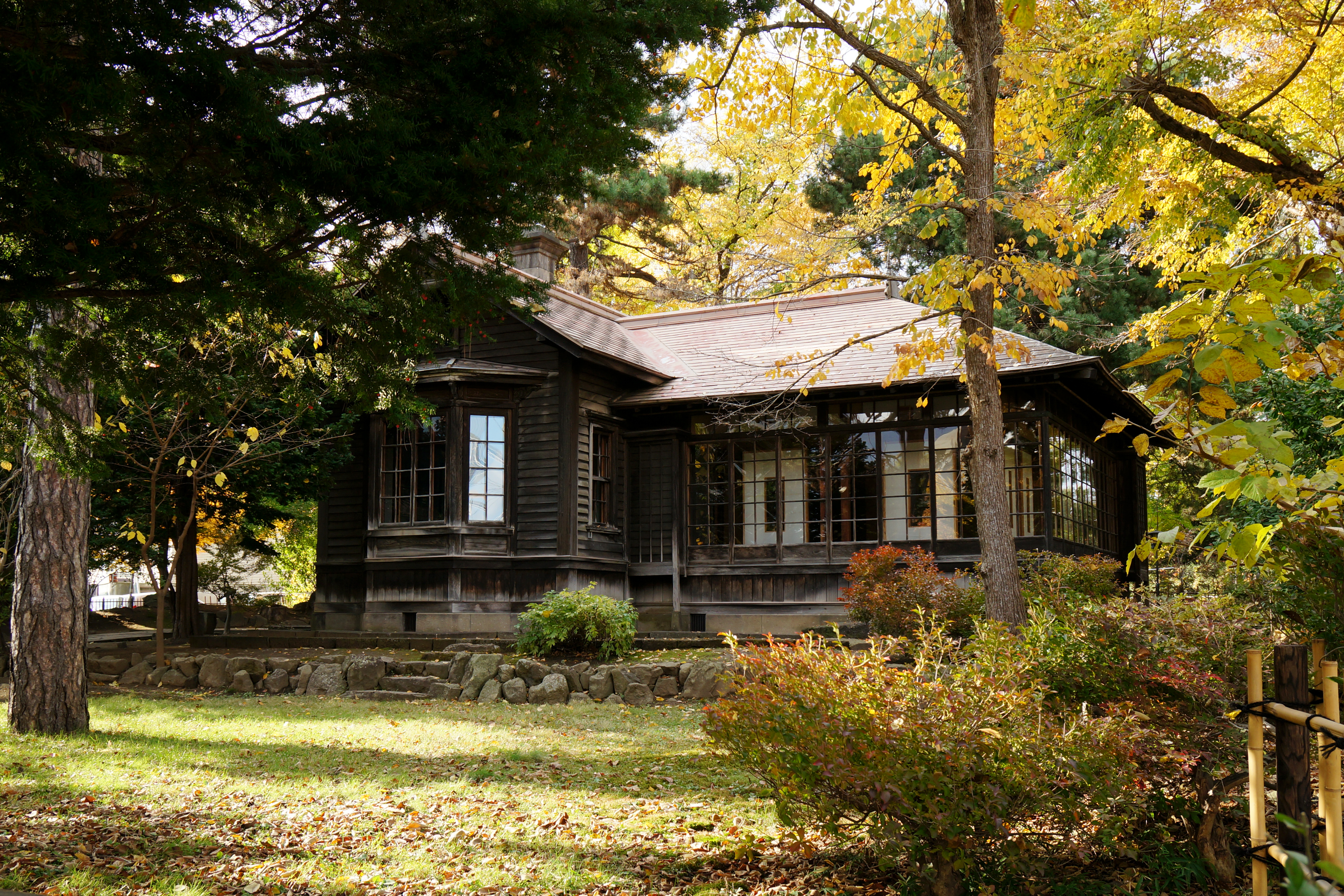

Location
- Coordinates: 43°4′7.32″N 141°20′37.32″E

Site history
- Built by: Hokkaidō Development Commission

The Tsinghua Pavilion or more commonly known as Seikatei (Japanese: 清華亭 (せいかてい)) is a residence that is composed of a blend of Japanese and Western architecture built in the Meiji-era located in North 7th street, West 7th street, North District, Sapporo, Hokkaido. It was built in 1880 by the Hokkaidō Development Commission, and turned into the resting place for the Meiji emperor in 1881. Now it is designated as a Tangible Cultural Property of Sapporo City.

== History ==
In the early years of the Showa period, a movement emerged to venerate the sites associated with the Meiji emperor as sacred sites, the Tsinghua Pavilion was included in this and its use for residential purposes was criticised. Around 1926, the Tsinghua Pavilion Preservation Society was formed headed by Tsunekichi Kono, which pushed for the preservation of the holy site. They began to repair and preserve the Tsinghua Pavilion in 1929 and donated it to Sapporo City in August 1933. In November 1933, the Tsinghua Pavilion was designated a National Historic Site as the "Meiji Emperor's Sapporo Imperial Resting Place".

In 1948, the designation of the building as a historical site for emperor worship was lifted. The city of Sapporo turned the Tsinghua Pavilion into staff housing for a while. In 1961, it was designated as a Tangible Cultural Property by Sapporo City as a historical building from the Meiji era showing the blend of Japanese and Western styles. Between 1977 and 1978, restoration work was carried out to restore the building to its original form.

== Timeline ==
It was completed June, 1880 (13th year of Meiji). The Meiji emperor rested at the Tsinghua Pavilion on 1 September 1881 (14th year of Meiji). The payment was received from Tsushima Kasaburo in January, 1897 (30th year of Meiji).

In 1929 (4th year of Showa) the Tsinghua Pavilion Preservation Society began managing the Tsinghua Pavilion and in August, 1933 (8th year of Showa) the Society donated the Tsinghua Pavilion to the city. On 3 November 1933 (8th year of Showa) it was designated a National Historic Site as the "Meiji Emperor's Sapporo Imperial Resting Place" but on 29 June 1948 (23rd year of Showa) the preceding designation was lifted.

In 1959 (34th year of Showa) the Tsinghua Pavilion Park was established and on 7 June 1961 (36th year of Showa) it was declared as a Tangible Cultural Property by Sapporo City.

Restoration of the Tsinghua Pavilion began in 1977 (52nd year of Showa) and was completed in 1978 (53rd year of Showa).

== Architecture ==
The building is small and made of wood, the exterior is in a Western in style, while a blend of Japanese and Western resides in the interior. It has both Western-style and Japanese-style rooms, a kitchen with an earthen floor, a tradition Japanese entrance (genkan), a storage room, and a toilet. Both the internal and external layout are irregular. The garden was created by the German-American agronomist Louis Boehmer in a blend of Japanese and Western style. The western side, where the Western style rooms are located, is 22.3 tsubo (approx. 73.7 sq.m.) and the eastern side, where the Japanese style rooms are located, is 14.9 tsubo (approx. 49.4 sq.m.).
