= Tokyo Midtown Nihonbashi =

Skyscraper in Tokyo, Japan

General information
- Status: Completed
- Type: Residential, Hotel, Office
- Location: Tokyo, Japan, Nihonbashi 1-Chōme, Nihonbashi
- Coordinates: 35.68347°N 139.77472°E
- Construction started: December 2021
- Completed: September 2026
- Owner: Mitsui Fudosan

Height
- Roof: 284 m (932 ft)

Technical details
- Structural system: All-Steel
- Floor count: 52 (+5 underground)
- Floor area: 374,800 m^{2} (4,030,000 sq ft)

Design and construction
- Architects: Pelli Clarke & Partners; Nikken Sekkei
- Developer: Nomura Real Estate Development
- Main contractor: Shimizu Corporation

Tokyo Midtown Nihonbashi also known as the Nihonbashi Nomura Mitsui Tower (日本橋野村三井タワー, Nihonbashi Nomura Mitsui tawā) is a mixed-use skyscraper in the Nihonbashi ward of Tokyo, Japan. Built between 2021 and 2026, the tower stands at 284 m (932 ft) tall with 52 floors, and is the current 4th tallest building in Japan.

== History ==
The tower was developed by Nomura Real Estate and Mitsui Fudosan as part of a urban redevelopment project of the 1-chome Central District comprising four blocks. The lower floors of the former Nihonbashi Nomura Building, a tangible cultural object certified by Chuo Ward, have been converted into shop space while the building's facade has been preserved in Block A. 48 apartment units and retail space are located in Block B. It has a total of 52 above ground floors and stands approximately 284 meters tall. At the time of its completion, it was the second tallest building in Tokyo after the Azabudai Hills Mori JP Tower.

It is the central building of the redevelopment project "Tokyo Midtown Nihonbashi" and is commonly known as "The Tower." It is a skyscraper that brings together offices, commercial facilities, a hotel, rental apartments, and MICE (Meetings, Incentives, Conferences, and Exhibitions) facilities.

== Architecture ==
Commercial facilities will be built on the first basement floor to the third floor, and it is planned to connect to the adjacent Nihonbashi 1-chome Mitsui Building (commonly known as "South"). The building will house one of the largest MICE and business support facilities in central Tokyo. It will include two halls and twelve conference rooms, and will be able to accommodate large-scale events such as shareholder meetings, exhibitions and other social events.

The tenth to twentieth floors and the twenty-second to thirty-eighth floors will be developed as offices, with the new Nomura Group headquarters located on the lower floors. Pharmaceutical company Daiichi Sankyo plans to move its headquarters to this building in the fall of 2027, using four floors. Outdoor sky gardens will be built on the tenth and twenty-first floors.

From the 39th to the 47th floors, Hilton's top-tier luxury hotel brand, "Waldorf Astoria Tokyo Nihonbashi" is planned to occupy the space. It will house a total of 197 guest rooms, three restaurants, an indoor pool, a spa, a fitness center, banquet halls, a chapel, and other facilities. From the 48th to the 51st floors, the first residences in the Asia Pacific region, "Waldorf Astoria Residences Tokyo Nihonbashi," will open, with 71 rental units. A lounge will be located on the 50th floor as a shared facility exclusively for residents.

== See also ==
- List of tallest buildings in Japan
- List of tallest structures in Tokyo
