= Koji Nagai =

Japanese business executive

- 永井 浩二
- Education: Chuo University
- Occupation: Chief Executive Officer
- Employer: Nomura Holdings

Koji Nagai (Japanese: 永井 浩二, Hepburn: Nagai Kōji) is a Japanese business executive. He served as the Chief Executive Officer of Nomura Holdings (NYSE: NMR).

== Early life ==
Nagai was born circa 1953. He graduated from Chuo University in Tokyo, where he studied the Law.

== Career ==
Nagai started his career at Nomura Holdings in 1981. In April 2012, he was appointed as its Head of Domestic Securities. On July 26, 2012, it was announced that he would serve as Chief Executive Officer of Nomura Holdings, replacing Kenichi Watanabe, who resigned in the wake of an "insider trading scandal". His appointment has been effective since August 1, 2012.

In December 2019, Koji Nagai announced that he is stepping down as CEO of Nomura and will be replaced by current COO Kentaro Okuda on April 1, 2020. Nagai will become chairman when he steps down and will carry on some roles within the company.
