= The Nomura Trust & Banking Co. =

Japanese bank

The Nomura Trust & Banking Co., Ltd. (野村信託銀行株式会社, Nomura Shintaku Ginkō Kabushiki Gaisha), founded in 1993, is a Japanese bank that provides both trust and banking services. It has over ¥50,000 million in capitalization.

It is part of the Nomura Group and is a wholly owned subsidiary of Nomura Holdings, Inc.
