= Eiji Hosoya =

Japanese businessman

Eiji Hosoya (細谷 英二, Hosoya Eiji, c. 1945 – 4 November 2012) was a Japanese businessman who served as the chairman of Resona Holdings, Japan's fifth largest bank by market share, from 2003 until his death in 2012. Hosoya was appointed Chairman of Resona in May 2003, is credited with leading Resona's revitalization in the wake of a 2003 taxpayer-funded bailout from the government for 1.96 trillion yen ($24 billion US dollars).

Hosoya graduated from the University of Tokyo in 1968. He joined the staff of the former Japanese National Railways, the state-owned railway network company, after college. The Japanese National Railway is the predecessor of the East Japan Railway Company and the other six members of the Japan Railways Group.

Hosoya worked on the privatization of the East Japan Railway Company.

== Resona ==
Resona Holdings, which used to be called Daiwa Bank Holdings Inc., was formed in December 2001 through the merger of Daiwa Bank Ltd., Kinki Osaka Bank Ltd. and Nara Bank Ltd. Asahi Bank Ltd. In March 2002, a fourth bank, Asahi Bank Ltd., joined the lending group as well.

In May 2003, Resona posted 838 billion yen loss which reduced the bank's capital below the minimum required levels, requiring it to seek a bailout from the Japanese government to stay afloat. Resona received a taxpayer funded bailout worth 1.96 trillion yen ($24 billion US dollars). The bailout required a shakeup in Resona's management.

Eiji Hosoya joined Resona as chairman in May 2003. He had arrived at Resona after helping with the privatization of the East Japan Railway Company. Hosoya was initially very reluctant to join Resona, telling reporters in a news conference on 30 May 2003, that "I decided to accept the offer as I realized that stabilizing the financial system is the highest priority for the Japanese economy."

Hosoya is widely credited with revitalizing Resona in the wake of the bailout, leading the bank back to financial stability. Hosoya proposed that Resona purchase of 1.3 trillion yen of preferred shares from the Japanese government by 2015. In January 2011, an equity group provided 545 billion yen towards the purchase proposal.

Hosoya raised the number of female managers at Hosoya to combat the gender gap in Japan's finance and business sectors. In a November 2011 interview, Hosoya noted that, "Companies that don't give women leading roles will be left behind."

He also sought to cut Resona's expenses. In 2008, Resona, under Hosoya, sold its headquarters building in Tokyo's pricey Ōtemachi financial district. Resona relocated to a new headquarters in Kiba, Koto, Tokyo.

Eiji Hosoya died from an illness at his home in Tokyo on 4 November 2012, at the age of 67.
