= Nomura Holdings =

Japanese financial holding company

Nomura Holdings, Inc.

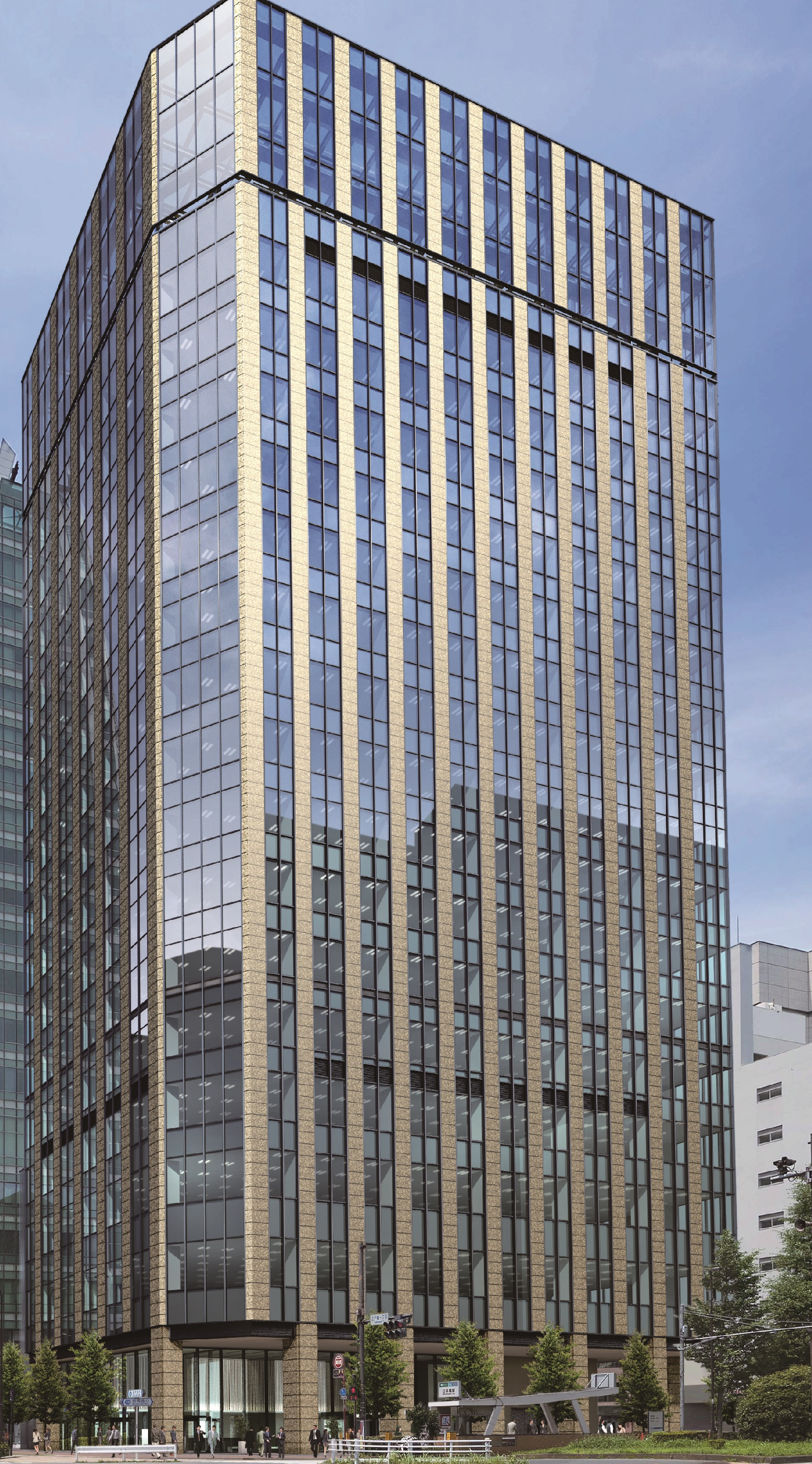
- Headquarters in Chuo, Tokyo
- Native name: 野村ホールディングス株式会社
- Romanized name: Nomura Hōrudingusu Kabushiki-gaisha
- Formerly: The Nomura Securities Co., Ltd. (1925-2001)
- Type: Public KK
- Traded as: TYO: 8604; NAG: 8604; SGX: N33; NYSE: NMR; TOPIX Large 70 component (TYO)
- Industry: Financial services
- Founded: 25 December 1925; 100 years ago in Osaka, Japan
- Headquarters: 1-9-1, Nihonbashi, Chuo, Tokyo, Japan
- Area served: Worldwide
- Key people: Koji Nagai (Chairman); Kentaro Okuda (President and Group CEO)
- Services: Financial services; Securities services; Banking; Investment management; Investment banking; Asset management
- Revenue: ▲¥2.16 trillion (2026)
- Operating income: ▲¥539.8 billion (2026)
- Net income: ▲¥362.1 billion (2026)
- AUM: ▲¥136.9 trillion (2026)
- Total assets: ▲¥62.6 trillion (2026)
- Total equity: ▲¥3.85 trillion (2026)
- Number of employees: 28,677 (2026)
- Subsidiaries: Nomura Securities Co., Ltd.; Nomura Asset Management Co., Ltd.; The Nomura Trust & Banking Co., Ltd.; Nomura Babcock & Brown Co., Ltd.; Nomura Capital Partners
- Website: nomura.com

Nomura Holdings, Inc. (Note: 野村ホールディングス株式会社, Nomura hōrudingusu kabushiki-gaisha) is a Japanese financial holding company and a principal member of the Nomura Group, which is Japan's largest investment bank and brokerage group. It, along with its broker-dealer, banking and other financial services subsidiaries, provides investment, financing and related services to individual, institutional, and government customers on a global basis with an emphasis on securities businesses.

== History ==
=== Origins ===
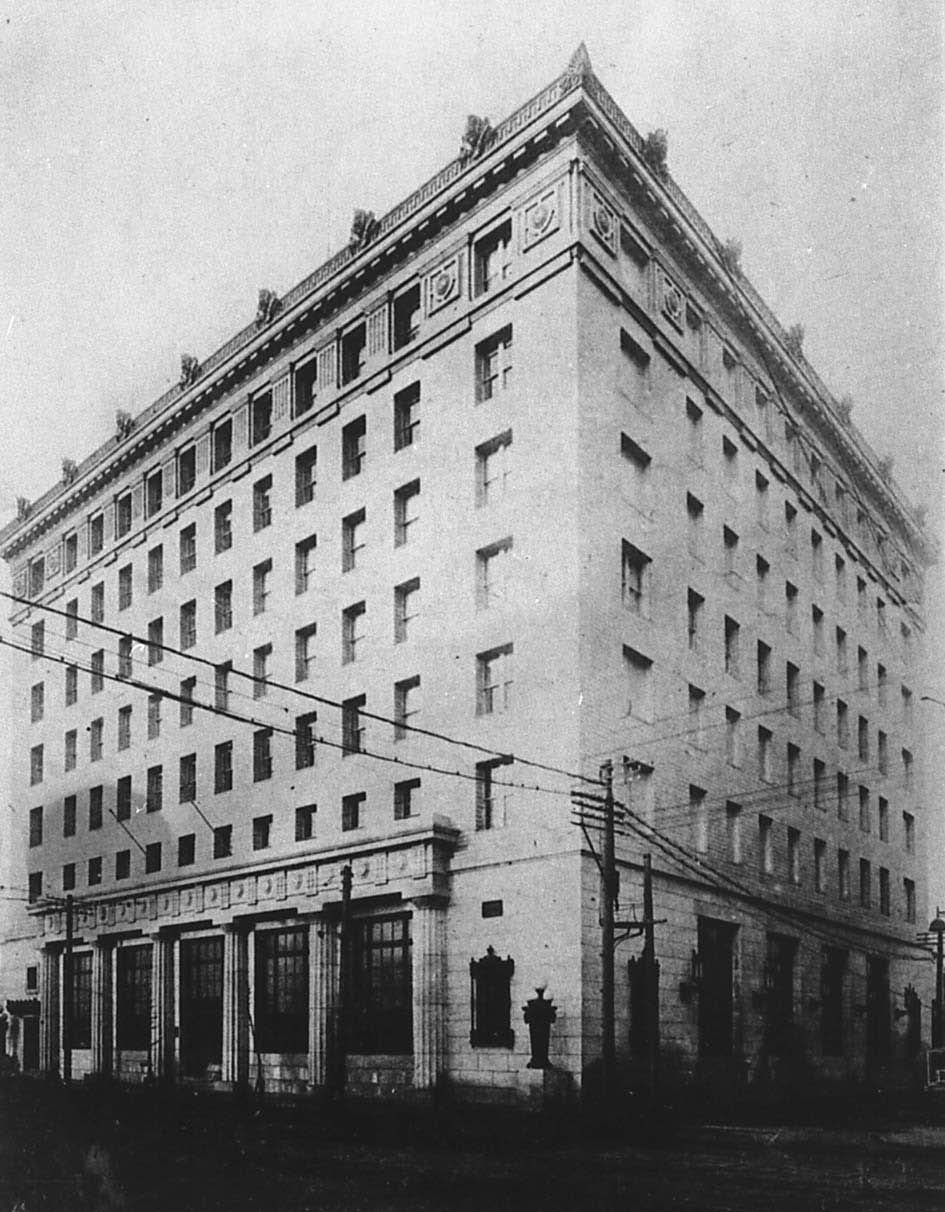
Sakaisuji Nomura Building (Nomura Building, Osaka Nomura Bank Head Office, Nomura Bank Head Office, Daiwa Bank Head Office). Built in February 1924 (Taisho 13).

The history of Nomura began on December 25, 1925, when Nomura Securities Co., Ltd. (NSC) was established in Osaka, as a spin-off from Securities Dept. of Osaka Nomura Bank Co., Ltd (the present day Resona Bank). NSC initially focused on the bond market. It was named after its founder Tokushichi Nomura II, a wealthy Japanese businessman and investor. He had earlier established Osaka Nomura bank in 1918, based on the Mitsui zaibatsu model with a capital of ¥10 million. Like the majority of Japanese conglomerates, or zaibatsu, its origins were in Osaka, but today operates out of Tokyo. NSC gained the authority to trade stock in 1938, and went public in 1961.

=== Lehman Brothers acquisition ===
In October 2008, Nomura acquired most of Lehman Brothers' Asian operations together with its European equities and investment banking units to make one of the world's largest independent investment banks with ¥20,300bn (£138bn) assets under management. In April 2009, the global headquarters for investment banking was moved out of Tokyo to London as part of a strategy to move the company's focus from Japan to global markets, with Josh Tokley appointed Head of UK Investments. Following his subsequent suspension, Tokley was replaced by Michael Coombs.

Nomura paid $225 million for the purchase of Lehman's Asia-Pacific unit. Due to large losses with shares dropping to their lowest level in nearly 37 years, Nomura cut around 5 percent of its staff in Europe (as many as 500 people) in mid-September 2011.

=== Greentech acquisition ===
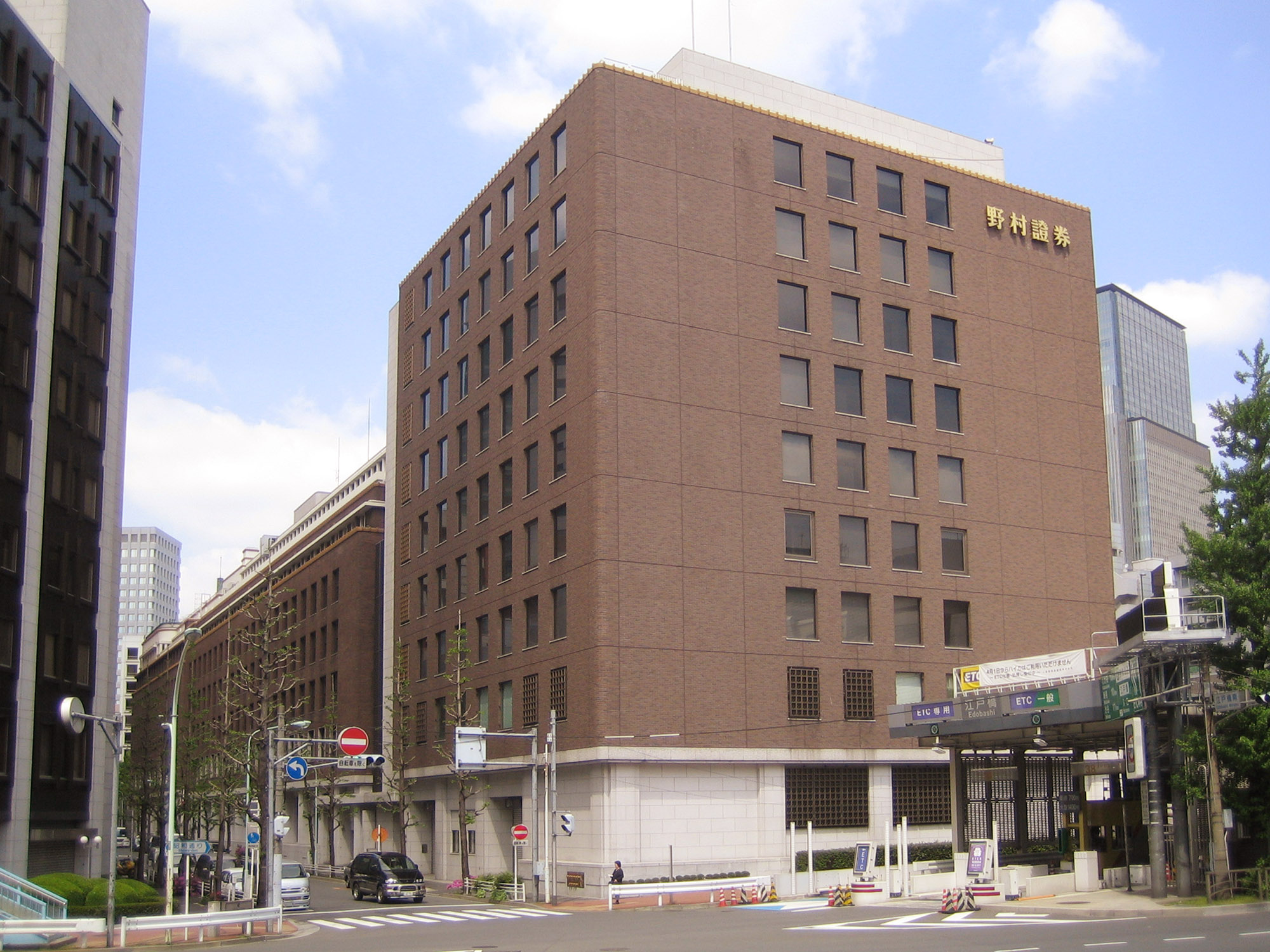
The headquarters of Nomura Securities, the holdings' core subsidiary, in Tokyo, Japan

In December 2019, Nomura announced that it would acquire Greentech Capital Advisors, a boutique investment bank with stated aims of assisting clients across sustainable technology and infrastructure. The transaction is expected to close on March 31, 2020.

Greentech will be rebranded to "Nomura Greentech" and will form part of their Investment Banking franchise in the U.S.

=== Macquarie asset management acquisition ===
In April 2025, Nomura agreed to acquire Macquarie's U.S. and European public asset management business in a $1.8 billion all-cash deal. As a result, Nomura's investment management division will take on roughly $180 billion in new assets across equities, fixed income and multi-asset strategies, for a total of approximately $770 billion in total assets under management (AUM). Expected to close by the end of 2025, the acquisition represents Nomura's largest international expansion since 2008, when it bought Lehman Brothers' Asian and European assets.

== Nomura Holdings and member companies ==
Nomura Holdings logo.

The marketing slogan of Nomura is "Connecting Markets East & West".

Nomura Holdings, Inc. is the holding company of the Nomura Group and the group's principal member. As a keiretsu, Nomura Holdings, Inc. does not directly run member companies, rather it keeps a controlling stake of cross shareholdings and manages financial assistance among member companies which help to deflect hostile takeovers.

=== Core members ===
- Nomura Holding America Inc. operates as a subsidiary of Nomura Holdings, Inc.
- Nomura Europe Holdings plc operates as a subsidiary of Nomura Holdings, Inc.
- Nomura Asia Holding N.V. operates as a subsidiary of Nomura Holdings, Inc.
- Nomura Securities, operates as a subsidiary of Nomura Holdings, Inc.
- Nomura Research Institute
- Nomura Financial Products Europe GmbH

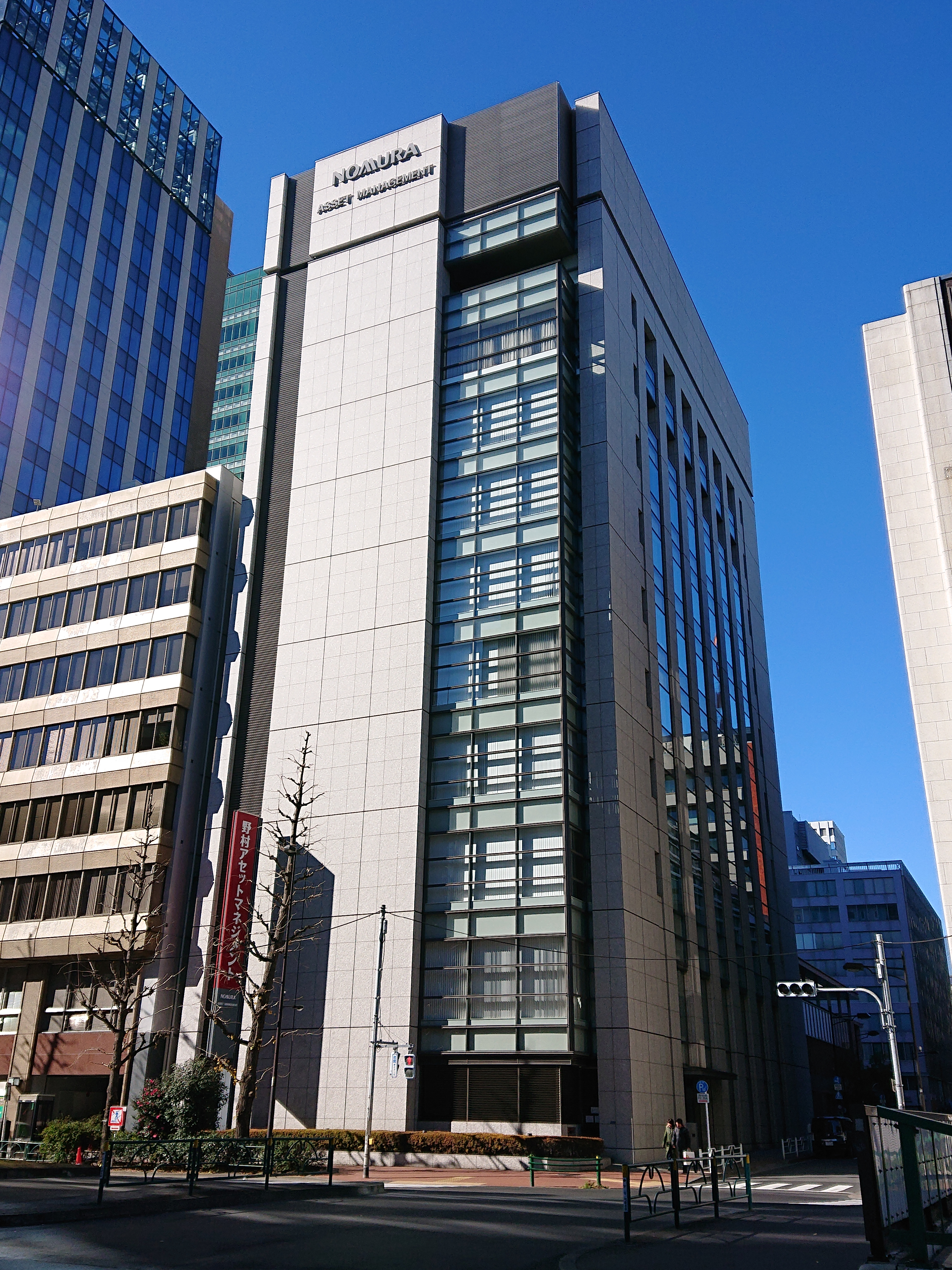
Nomura Asset Management (野村アセットマネジメント) headquarters, located at 1-12-1 Nihonbashi, Chuo, Tokyo, Japan

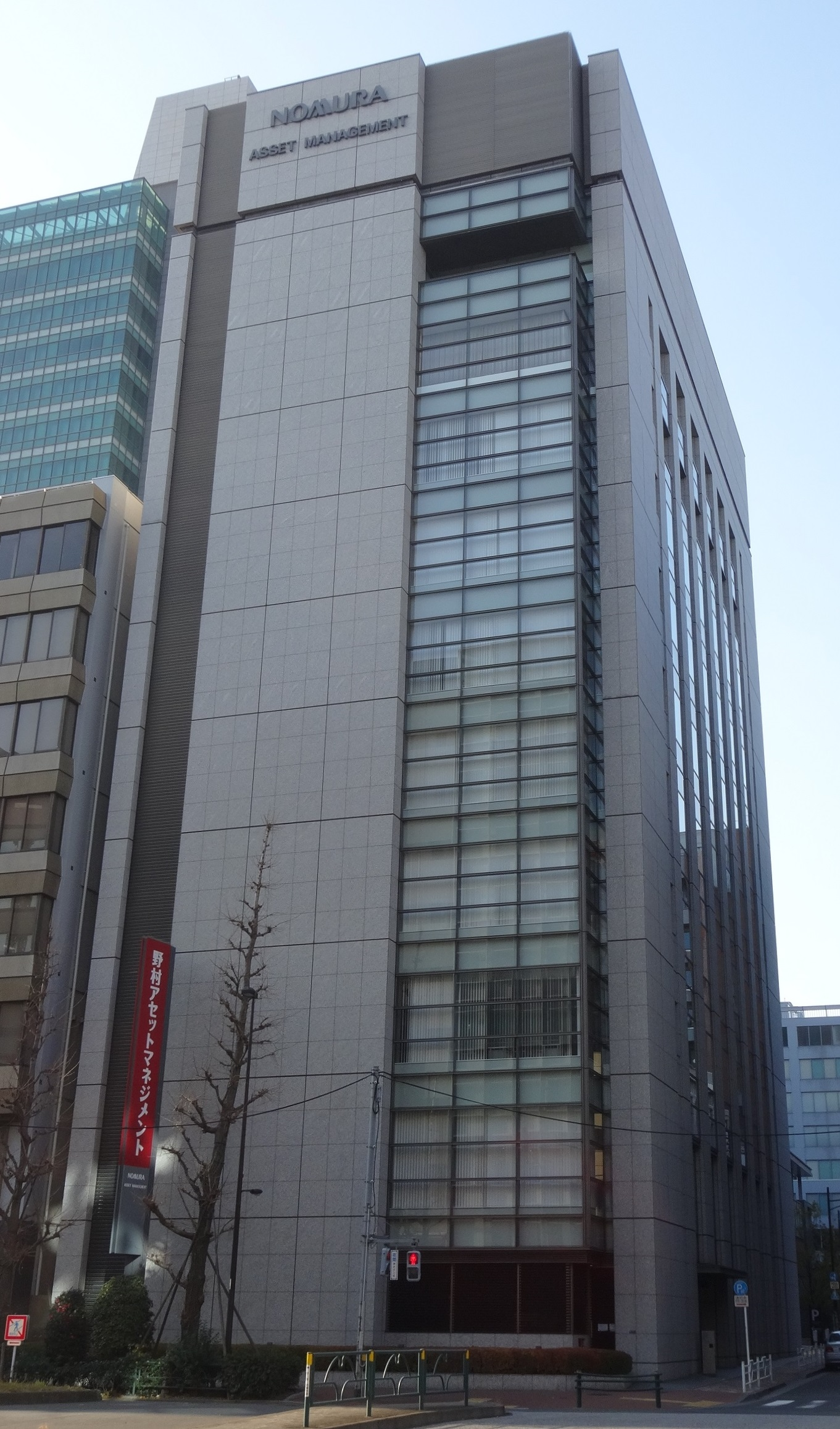
Nomura Asset Management the head office (Chuo-ku, Tokyo, Japan)

- Nomura Asset Management Co., Ltd.
- The Nomura Trust & Banking Co.
- Nomura Babcock & Brown Co., Ltd.
- Nomura Capital Investment Co., Ltd.
- Nomura Investor Relations Co., Ltd.
- Nomura Principal Finance Co., Ltd.
- Nomura Funds Research And Technologies Co., Ltd.
- Nomura Pension Support & Service Co., Ltd.
- Nomura Research & Advisory Co., Ltd.
- Nomura Business Services Co., Ltd.
- Nomura Satellite Communications Co., Ltd.
- Nomura Facilities, Inc.
- Nomura Institute of Capital Markets Research
- Nomura Services India Pvt. Ltd.
- Nomura Healthcare
- Nomura Private Equity Capital
- Unified Partners
- Nomura Agri Planning & Advisory
- Instinet

== Nomura Securities ==
Nomura Securities Co., Ltd. is a Japanese financial services company and a wholly owned subsidiary of Nomura Holdings, Inc. (NHI), which forms part of the Nomura Group. It plays a central role in the securities business, the group's core business. Nomura is a financial services group and global investment bank. Based in Tokyo, Japan, with regional headquarters in Hong Kong, London, and New York, Nomura employs about 26,000 staff worldwide; it is known as Nomura Securities International in the US, and Nomura International plc. in EMEA. It operates through five business divisions: retail (in Japan), global markets, investment banking, merchant banking, and asset management.

Established December 25, 1925 in Osaka, it is the oldest brokerage firm in Japan. It is named after its founder Tokushichi Nomura II, a wealthy Japanese businessman and investor.

=== History ===
==== Background (before 1925) ====
Nomura was founded by Tokushichi Nomura, father of Nomura Securities founder Tokushichi Nomura II as a money changing business. This was just before the Meiji Restoration, the move to setting up a bank was a logical extension and progression of this business as times changed. Changes included the founding of stock exchanges in Tokyo and Osaka as the country became industrialised. Key amongst these changes was the Japanese government's decision to issue foreign currency denominated public bonds to fund the Russo-Japanese War; Nomura employed English speaking staff so that they could take on this international business.

By 1906 Nomura had founded an in-house research department headed up by former Osaka newspaper journalist Kisaku Hashimoto. This was responsible for publishing the Osaka Nomura Business News with trading news, stock analysis and current economic trends. Research combined with a substantial newspaper advertising campaign helped raise the profile of Nomura. By 1917, Nomura had gone public and soon after Osaka Nomura Bank (the present day Resona Bank) was set up, within this business there was a securities section to handle bond sales and underwriting.
