= Japanese-Western Eclectic Architecture =

Western-influenced Architectural movement in Japan

Japanese-Western Eclectic Architecture (Japanese: 和洋折衷建築, Hepburn: Wayō Setchū Kenchiku) is an architectural style that emerged from the Eclecticism in architecture movement of the late 19th and early 20th century, which intentionally incorporated Japanese architectural and Western architectural components into one building design. The style is both a precursor to and a style of Modern Japanese Architecture (近代和風建築, Kindai Wafū Kenchiku).

The style emerged in Yokohama in the 1853–1867 Bakumatsu period, and spread throughout Japan after the 1868 Meiji Restoration, and then to Asian and Western countries during the expansion of the Empire of Japan.

This architectural style is characterised by both components of enlightenment Western-style architecture and components of historically emblematic traditional Japanese architecture.

Buildings that are early exemplary representations of this style are: The First National Bank of Japan (第一国立銀行, Daiichi Kokuritsu Ginkō) built by Mistui Group (三井組, Mistui Gumi) in 1872, the Kaichi School Museum building built in 1876, and Seika Restaurant (清華亭, Seika Tei) built in 1881.

== History ==
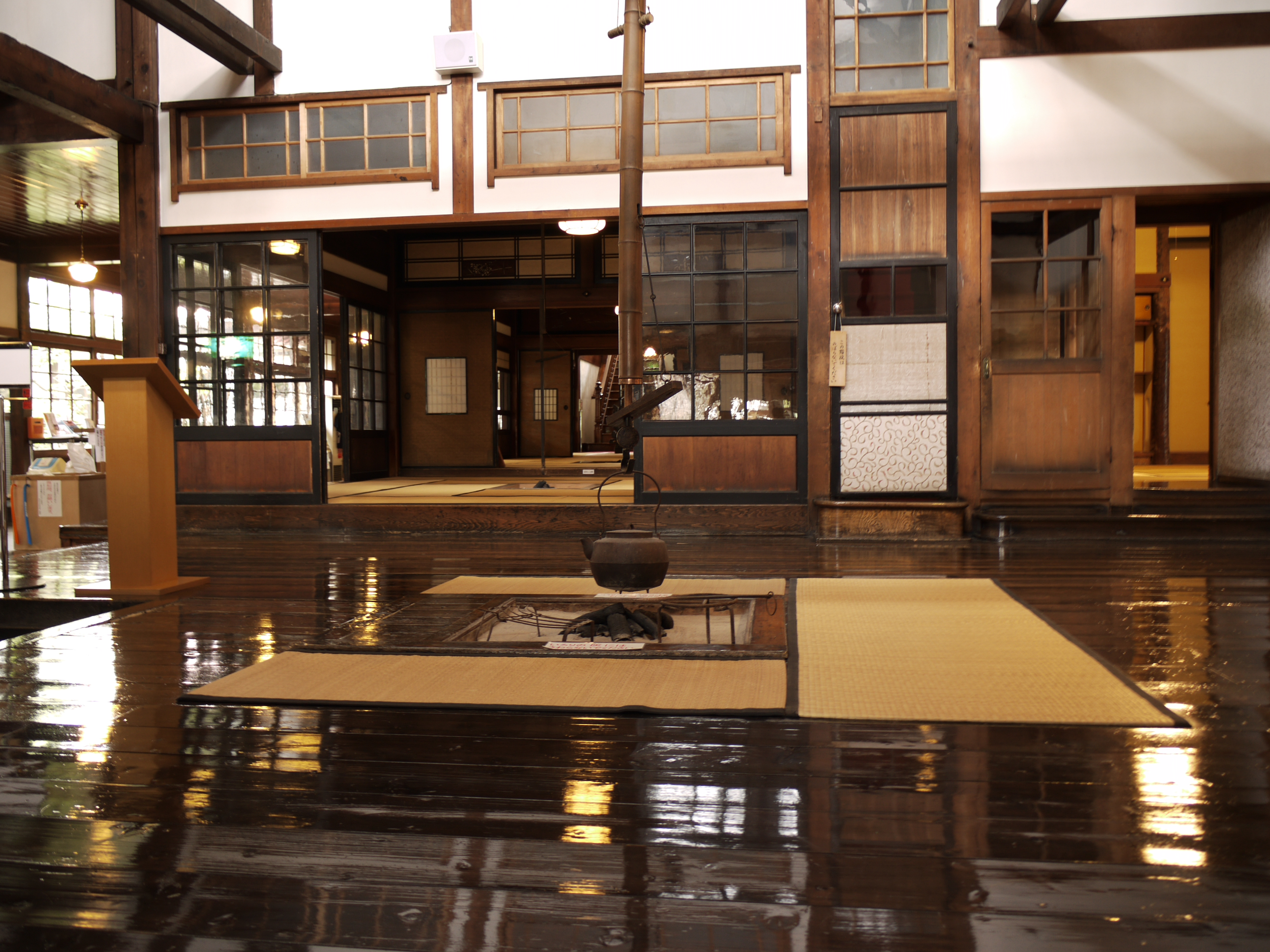
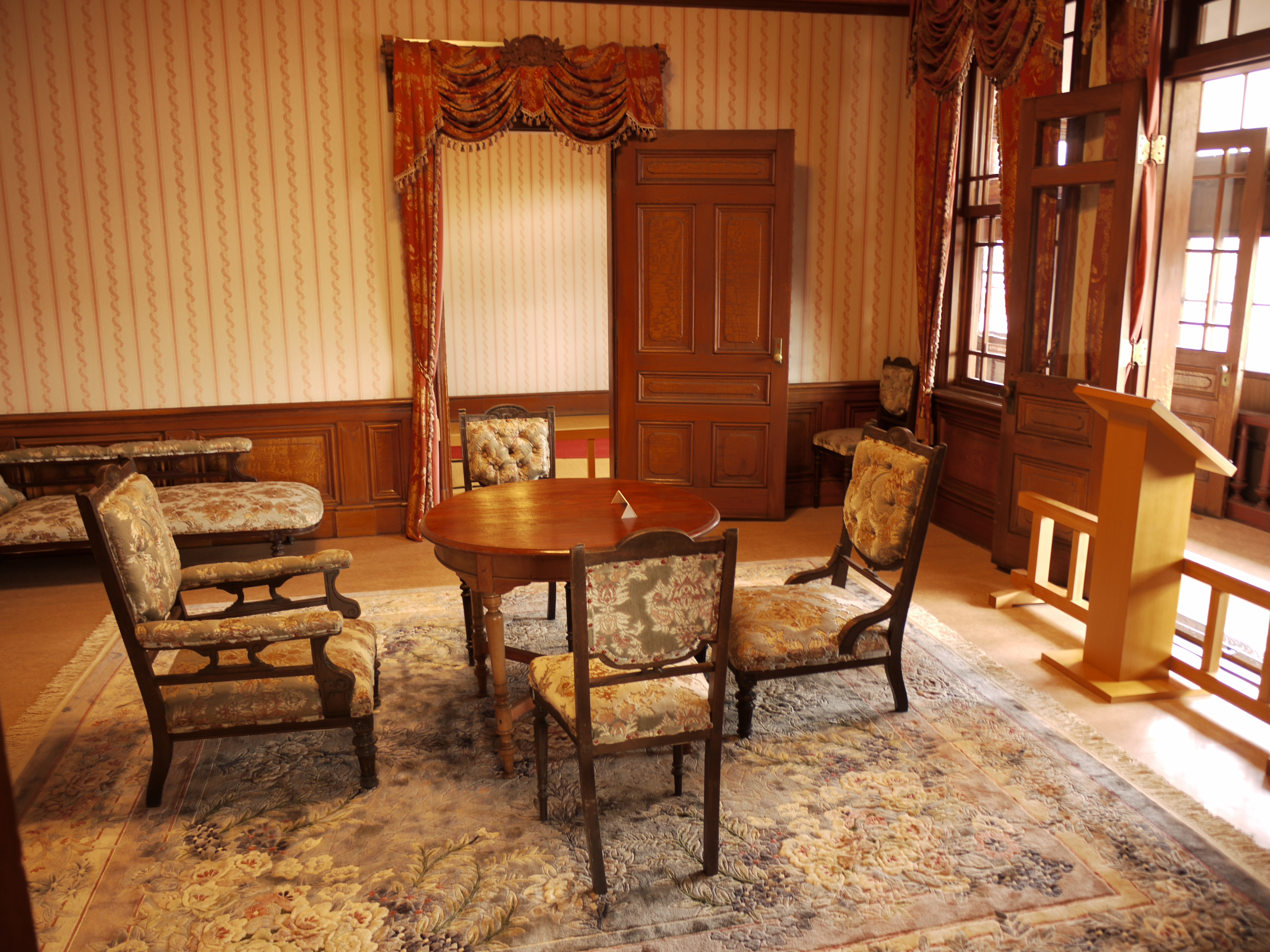
Left, 1st floor traditional Japanese entrance with tatami flooring in the rooms in the background. Right, the Western style visitor's room (Ousestu Shitsu), on the 2nd floor of the Shayōkan mansion, (built 1907).

The earliest examples of Japanese-Western Eclectic Architecture were built by the French government as part of the Japonism artistic movement's influence on French architecture. The term Japanese-Western Eclectic Architecture had been used by Waseda University sociologist Wajiro Kon, in his 1925 survey of housing recently built along the Chūō Main Line in Tokyo. Wajiro reviewed 588 houses built in 1921 near Asagaya Station and categorised them as Japanese Style, Culture Style, and Japanese Western Style respectively. In Kon's original thesis, the single criterion that needed to be met for classifying a house as Japanese Western Eclectic Architecture was the inclusion of a Western style Visitor's Room (応接室, Ousetsu Shitsu).

== Examples of Japanese-Western Eclectic Architectural Styles ==
The Japanese-Western Eclectic Architecture emerged in the final years of the Edo period in Yokohama, and then spread to other parts of Japan. The development of the style started with early architectural examples from Yokohama.

=== Bakumatsu Period Yokohama ===
These examples were built within the Foreign settlement (外国人居留地, Gaikokujin Kyoryū Chi) jurisdiction, where the military Bakumatsu government had allowed concessions to foreign governments.

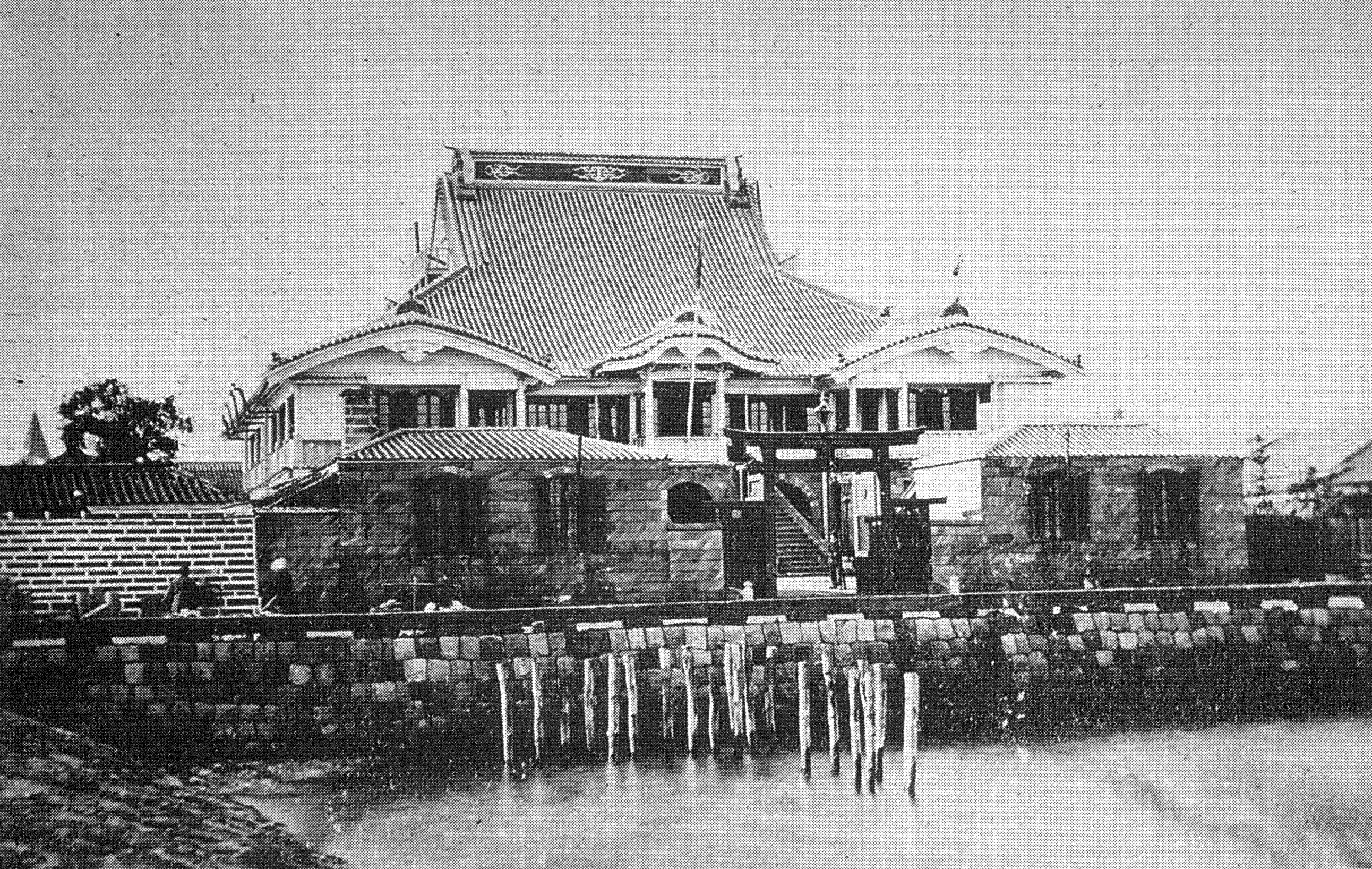
The French Naval Hospital built in 1865 is a distinct derivative of Japanese Western Architectural Style called Giyōfū architecture.

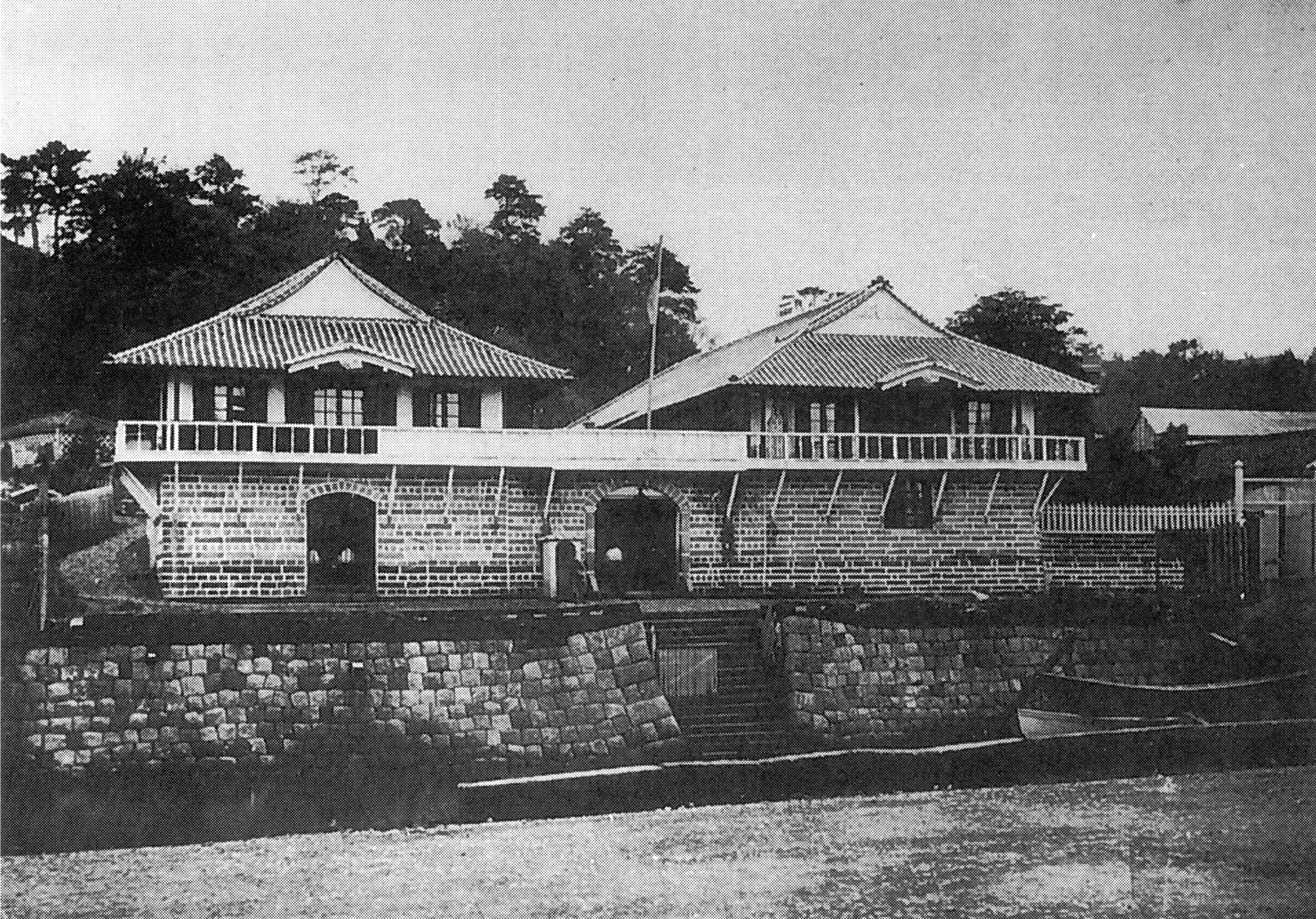
The French Military Station built in 1864.

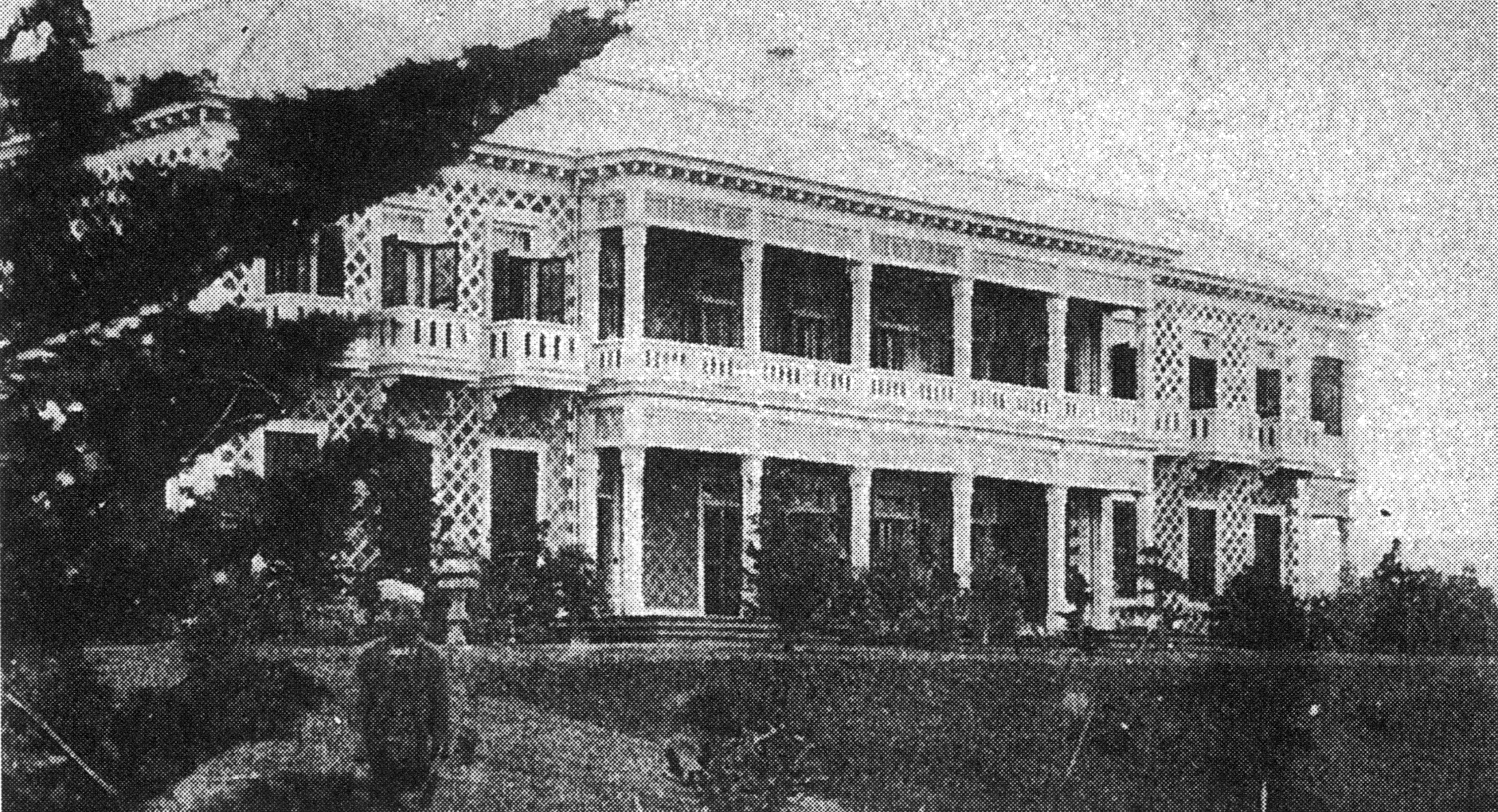
The British Provisional Legation built in 1867

=== Post Meiji Restoration ===
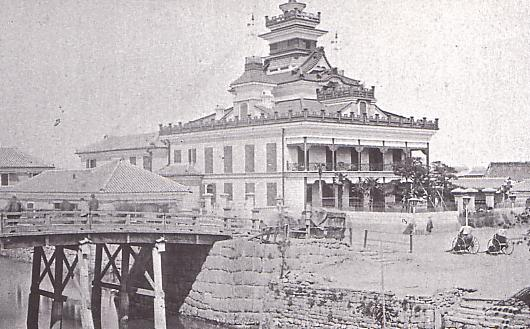
The First National Bank of Japan (1872)

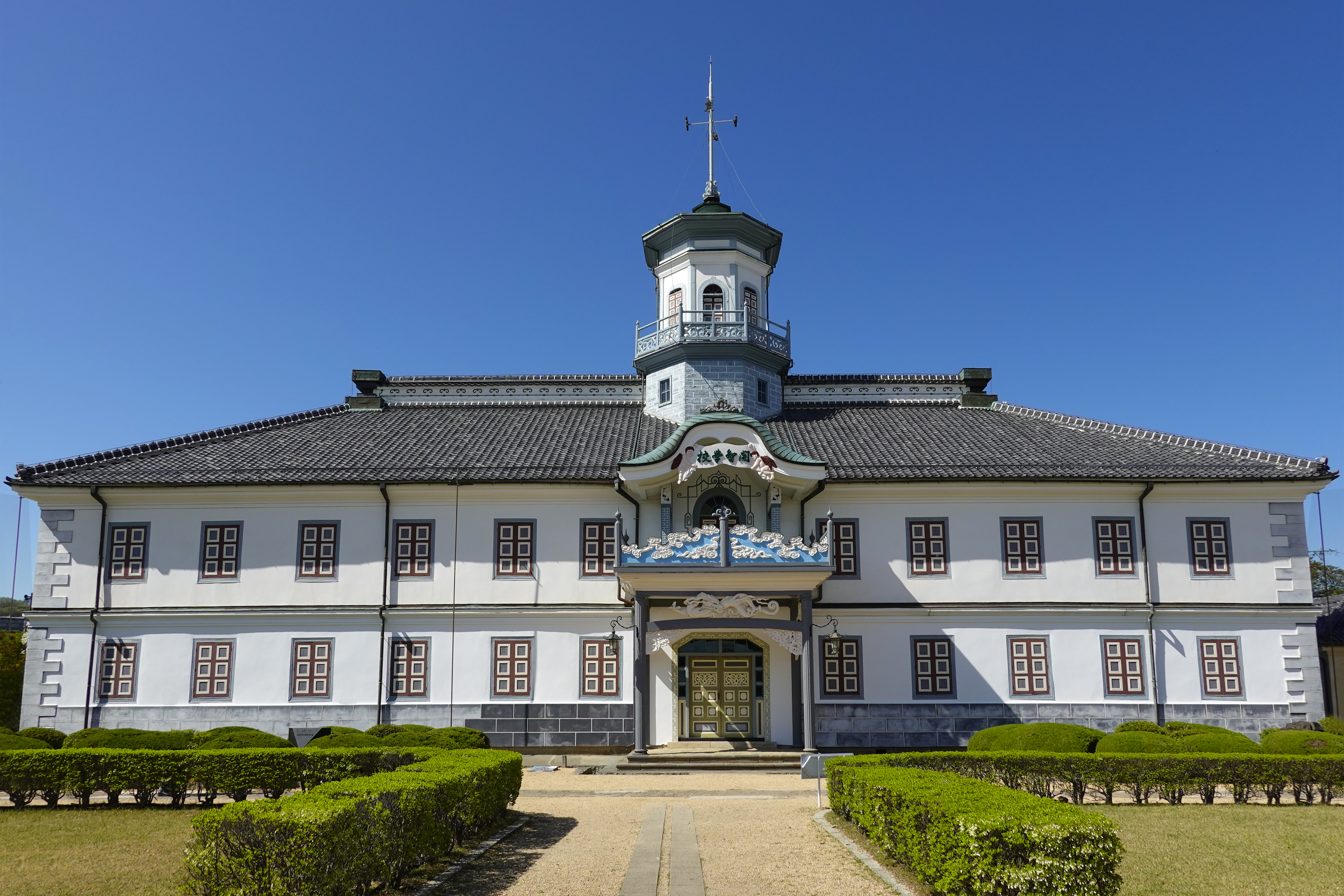
Former Kaichi School in the Kaichi School Museum Building in one of the Japanese-Western Eclectic Architectural styles called Giyōfu architecture

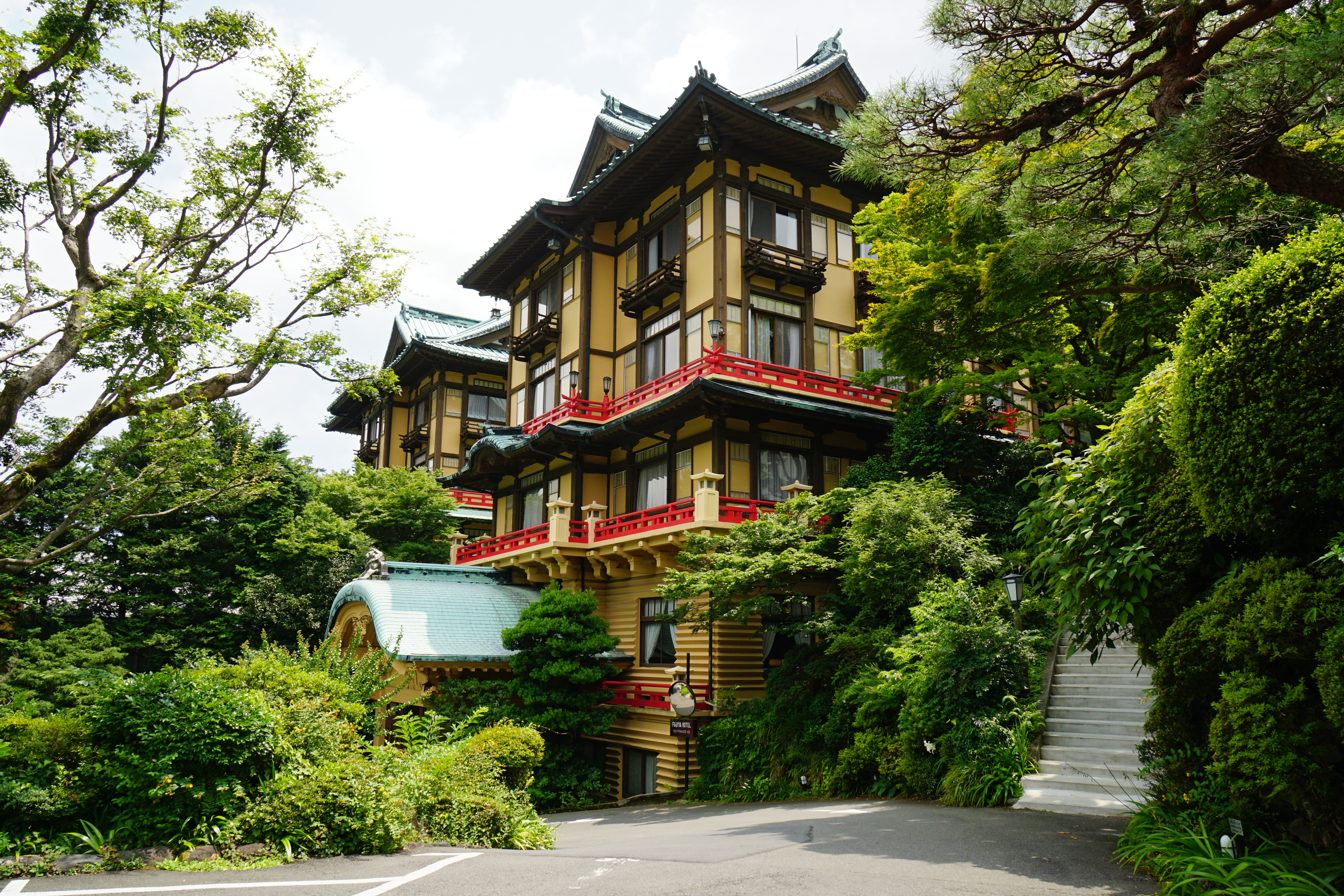
Fujiya Hotel established in 1878, Hakone

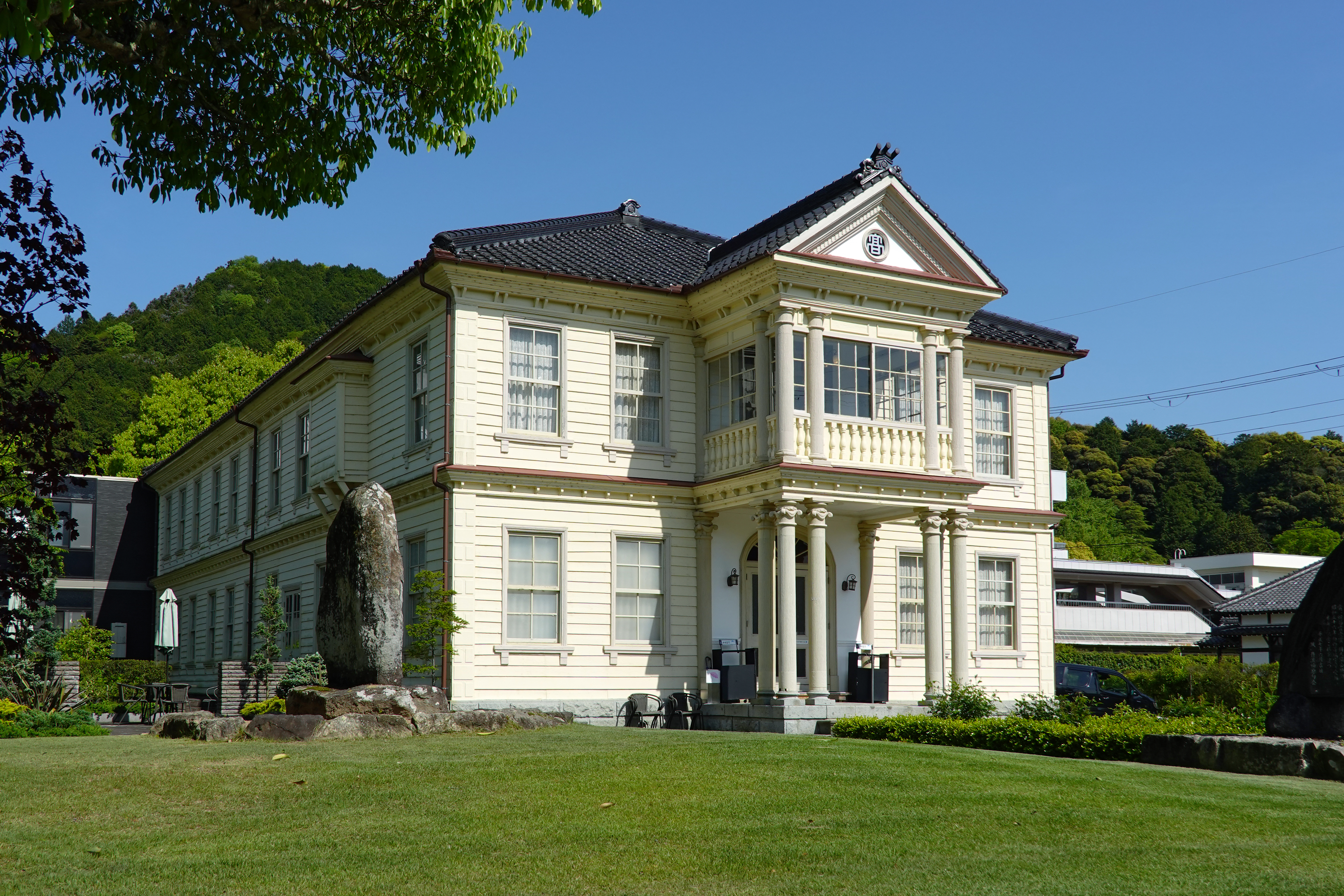
Old Hikami District's Towns-and-villages associations' Higher elementary school established in 1885, Tamba, Hyogo

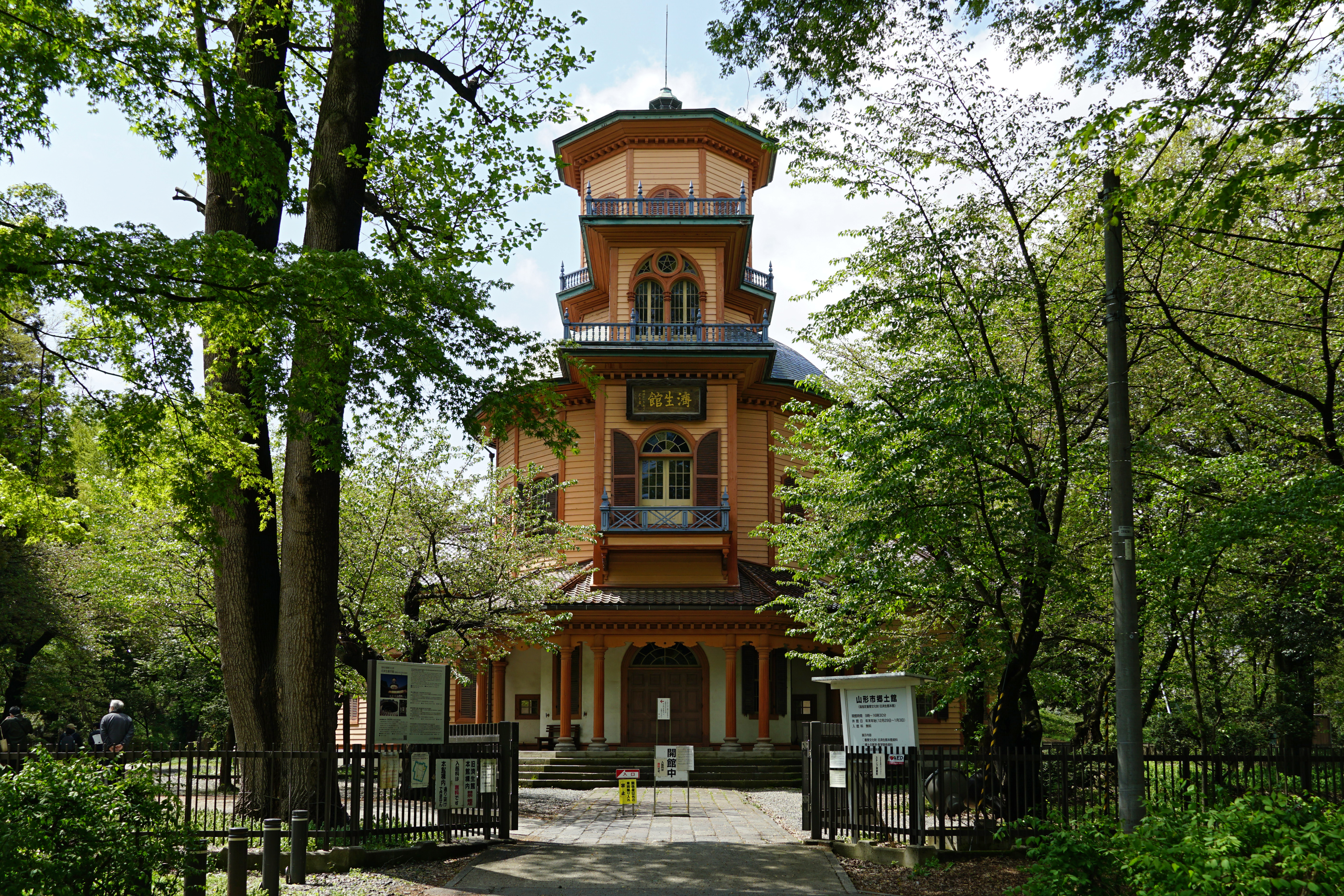
Former Saiseikan hospital built in 1878, Yamagata Prefecture

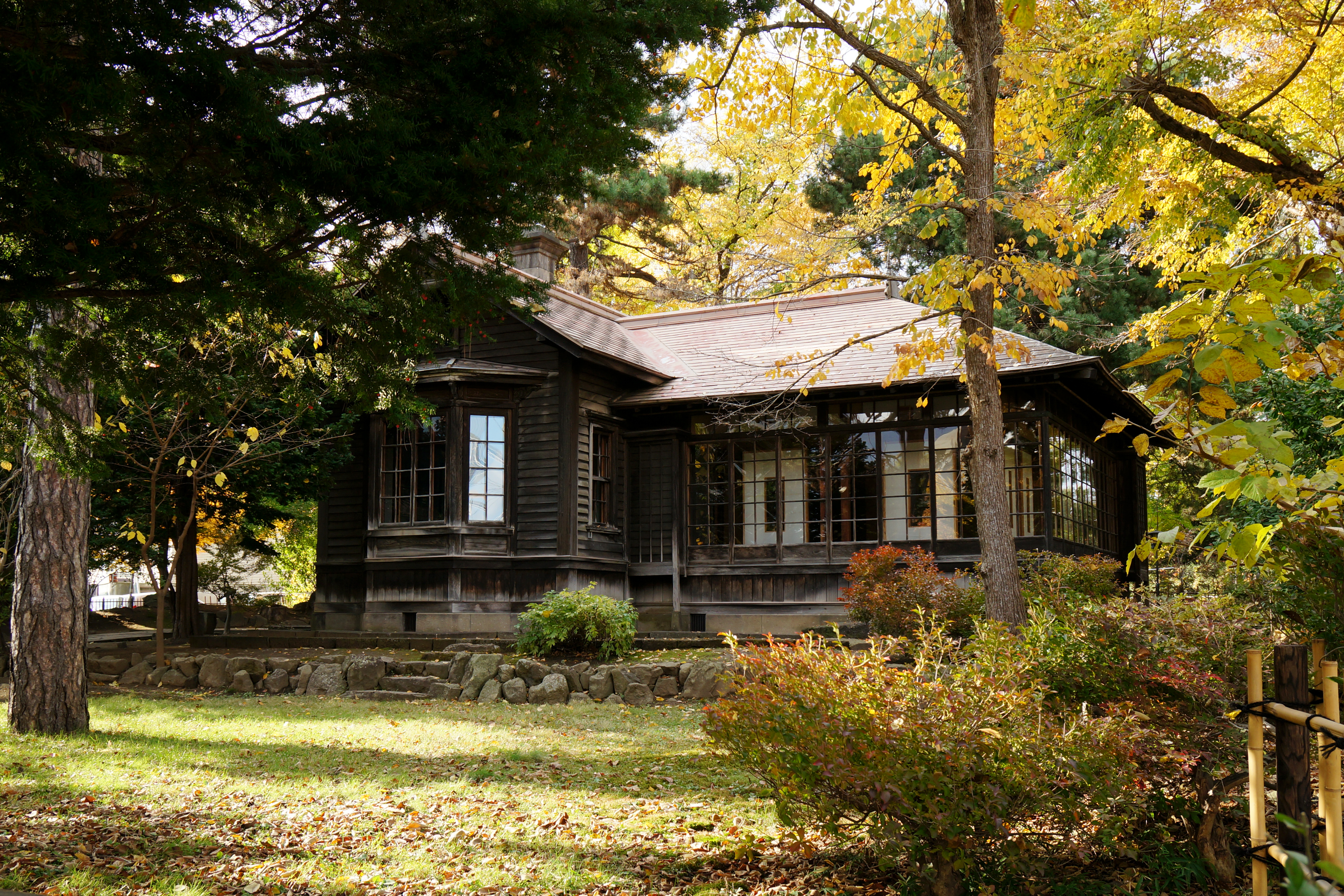
Seikatei (1880)

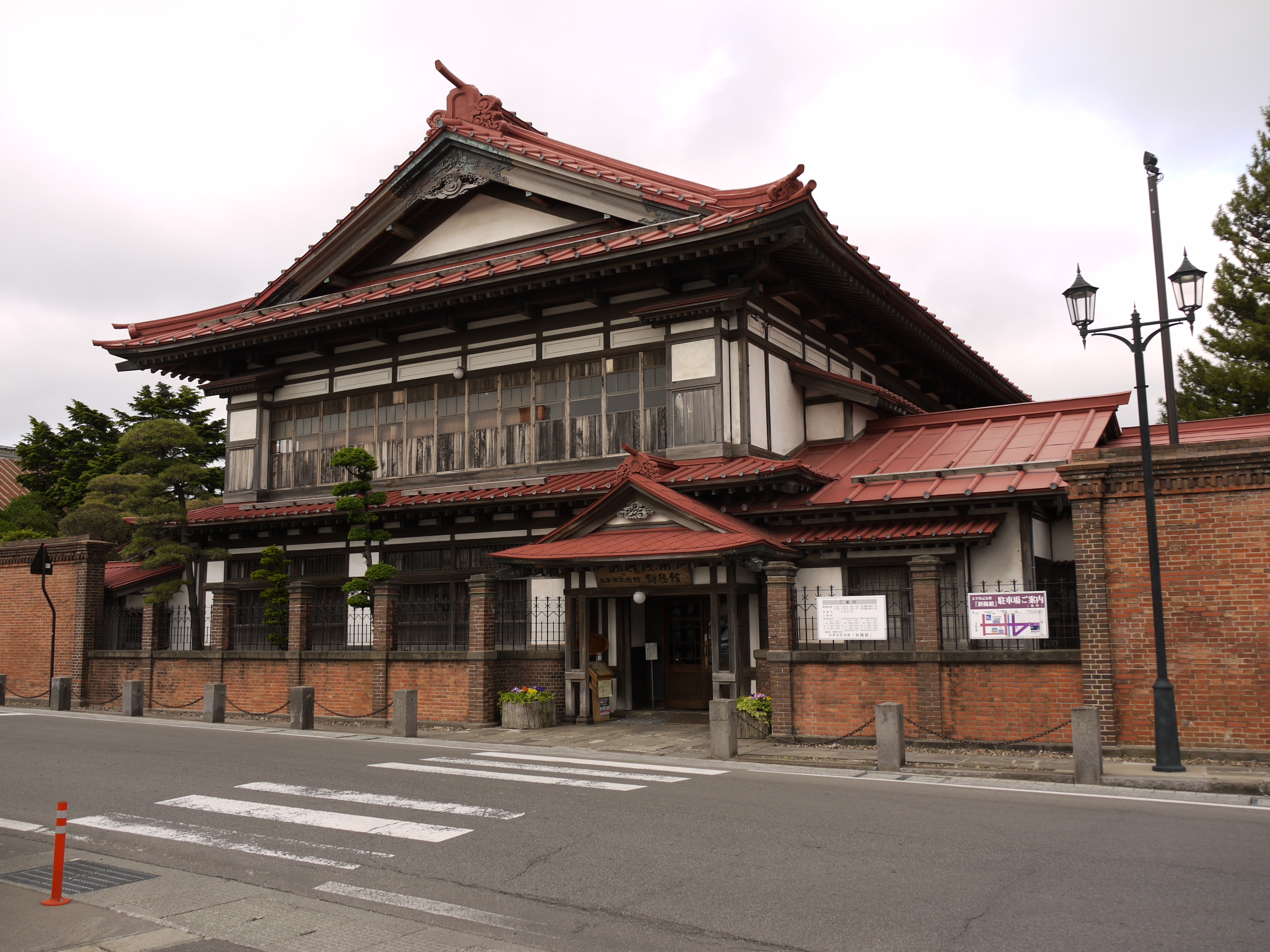
Shayokan built in 1907, was the birthplace of author Dazai Osamu.

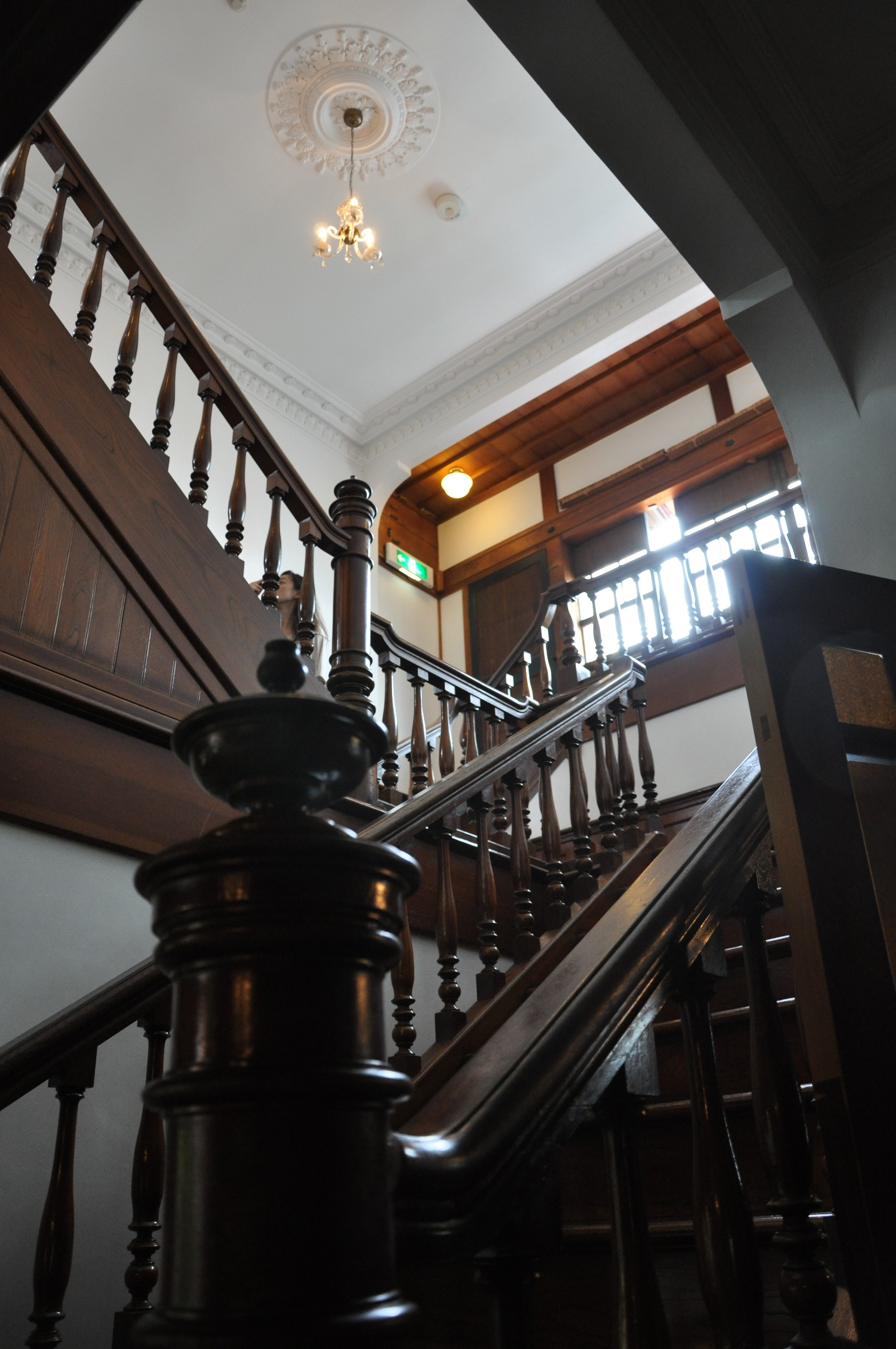
Western style staircase of Shayokan

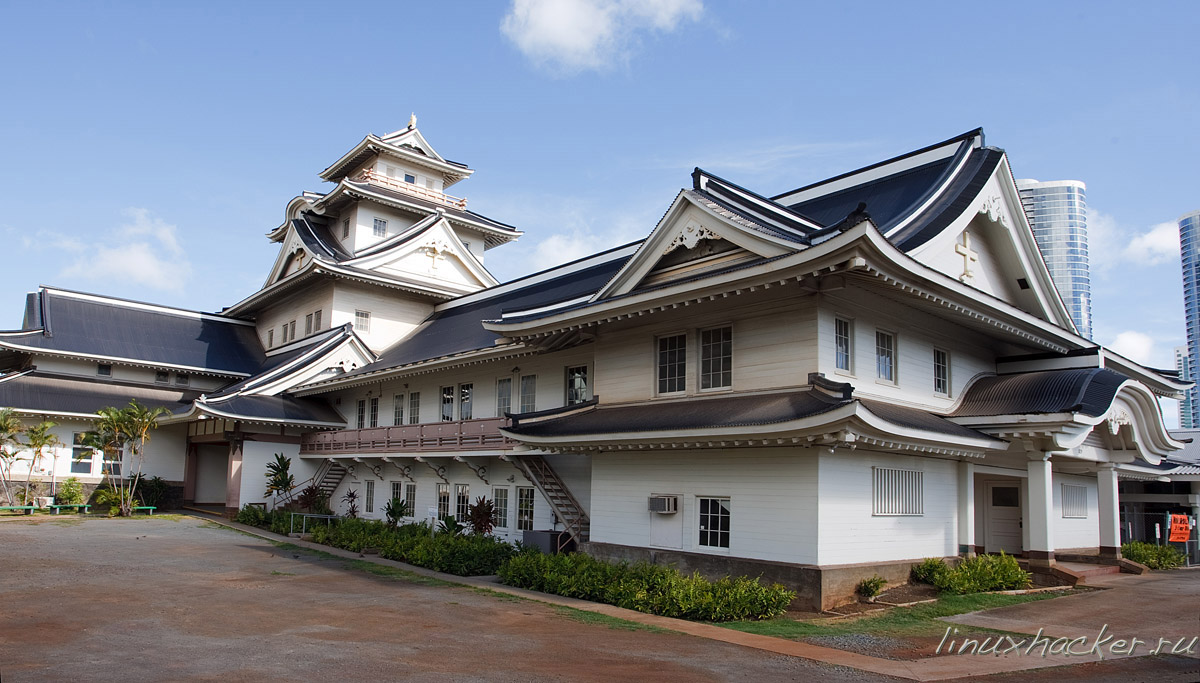
Makiki Christian Church building, Hawaii, completed in 1934.

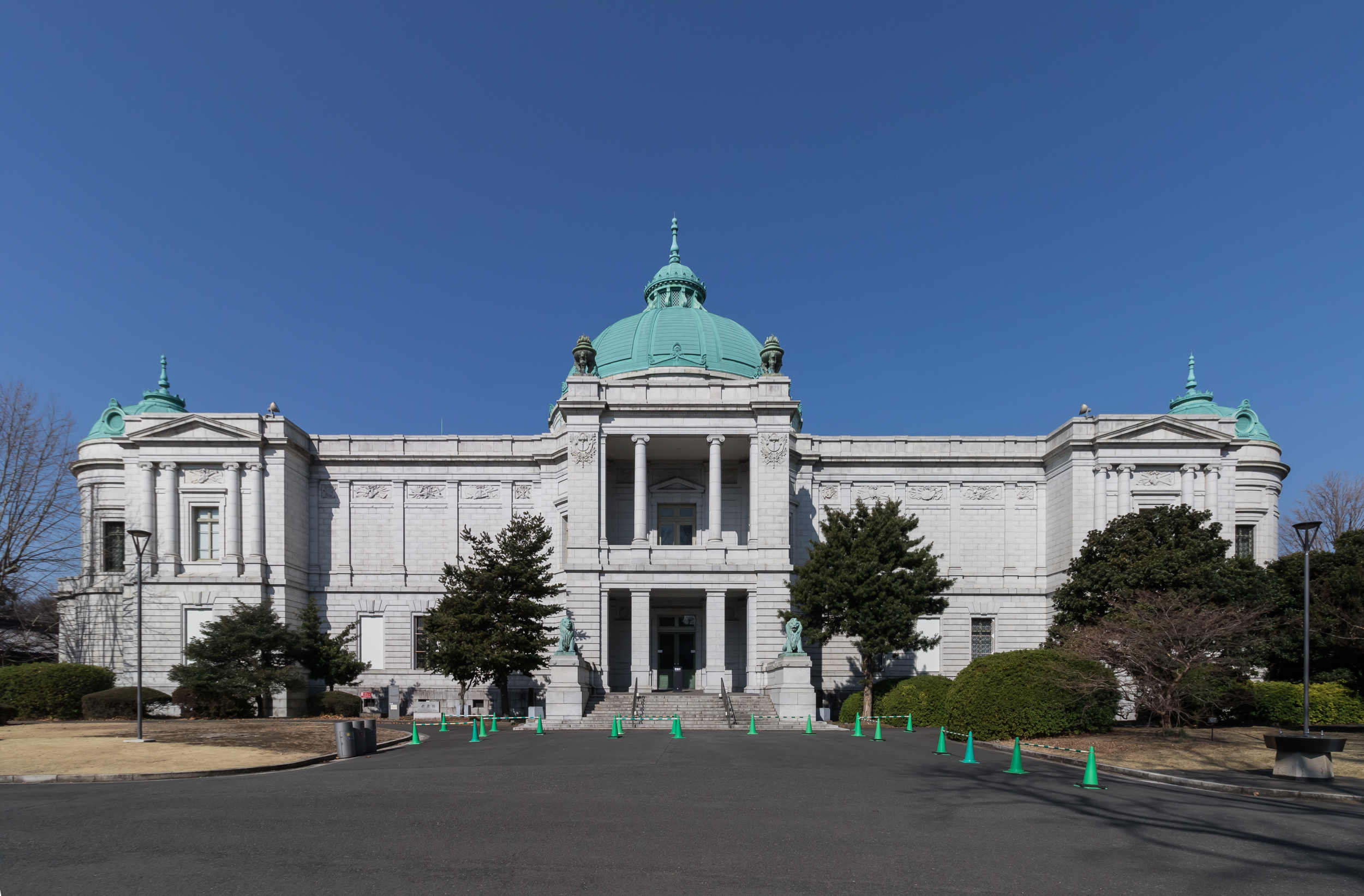
The Hyokeikan wing of the Tokyo National Museum, first opened in 1909.
