= Tokushichi Nomura II =

Japanese politician (1878-1945)

Tokushichi Nomura
- 野村 徳七
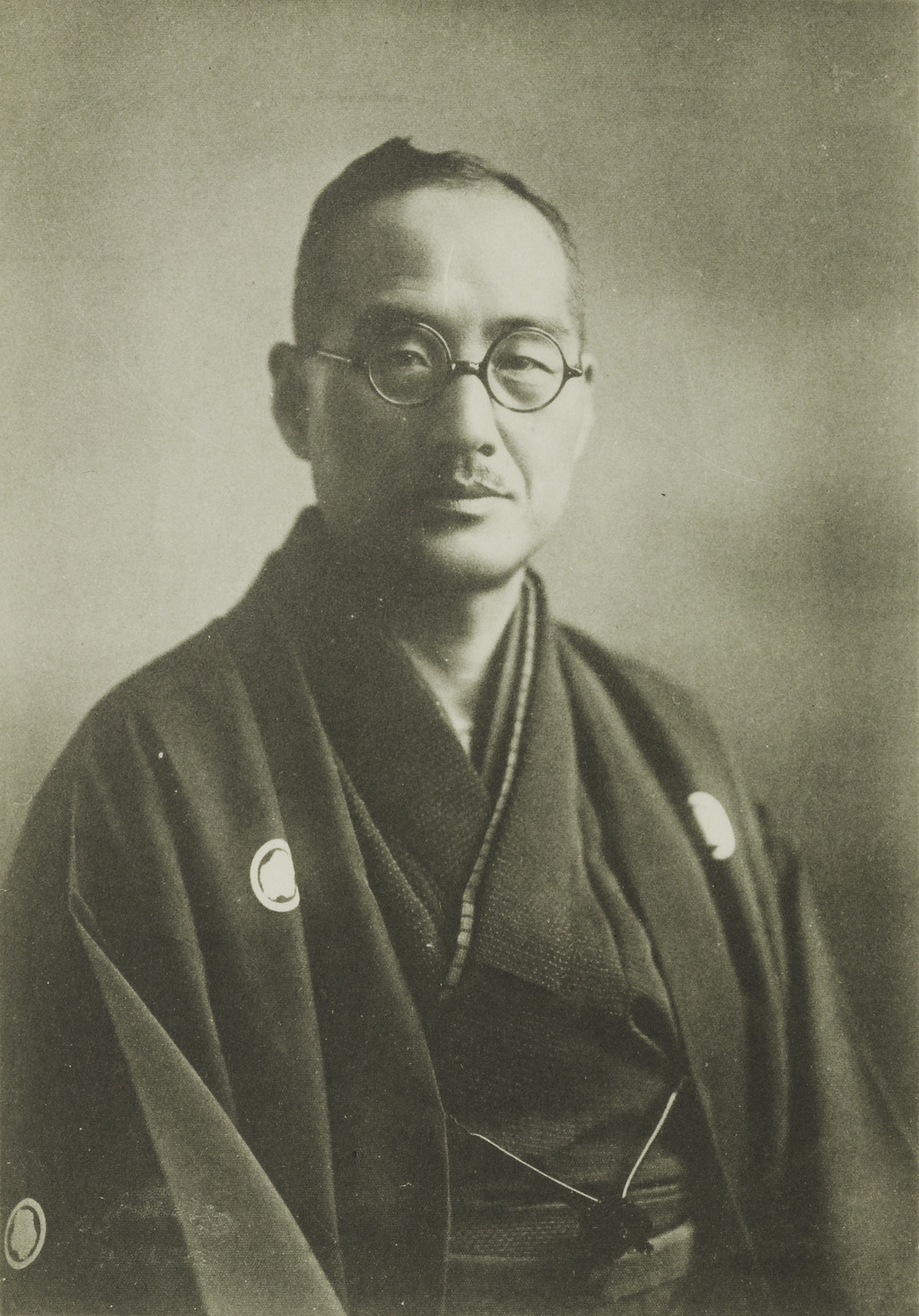

Member of the House of Peers
- In office 4 April 1928 – 15 January 1945 Nominated by the Emperor

Personal details
- Born: 7 August 1878 Yao, Osaka, Japan
- Died: 15 January 1945 (aged 66) Kobe, Hyōgo, Japan
- Occupation: Founder of Nomura Group
- Nickname: Shinnosuke

Tokushichi Nomura II (野村 徳七 二代; 7 August 1878 – 15 January 1945) was a Japanese businessman, investor and politician. He was the founder of the Nomura Group zaibatsu and Nomura Securities, and served as a member of the House of Peers.

== Early life and family ==
Nomura was born on 7 August 1878, in present-day Yao, Osaka, the eldest son of businessman Tokushichi Nomura I and Taki (née Yamauchi). He was known as Shinnosuke in his childhood. His father had been born to Doi Ōinokami, the lord of Hirano, and a woman bearing the surname Nomura, and was later adopted by Ōsakaya Yahē, the proprietor of a money-exchange business in Osaka; Tokushichi Nomura I later founded the money-exchange business Nomura Shōten in 1872. His mother was a former employee of Ōsakaya's business. In the year of his birth, 1878, his father's business had expanded and established new exchanges in Osaka and Tokyo. Nomura had five siblings; an elder sister Kiku, younger brothers Jitsusaburō, Tokushirō, Gengorō, and a younger sister Tani.

Nomura was accepted into Osaka School of Commerce in 1891, but gave up proceeding beyond preparatory courses after contracting pneumonia in 1895. He then studied commercial bookkeeping at Kizakijuku, graduating in 1897.

== Career ==
=== Family business ===
Nomura and his younger brother Jitsusaburō began work at the family's money-exchange business. The work was mainly money-exchange, but Nomura left this work to his brother, himself focusing on studying stock exchange and working at Yatsushiro Shōten. There, he attempted self-trading but failed, and returned to the family business. The First Sino-Japanese War had a severe impact on the securities market, and Nomura gave up his studies to take over the family business in 1897.

=== First fortune ===
Nomura made his first fortune in 1915, investing in Fukushima Boseki, a textile company that was widely believed to be headed for bankruptcy. Nomura knew better: He was a friend of the firm's founder Yutaro Yasuhiro. One day, after a hefty sell-off of the firm's shares, he moved quickly, pestering the management to show him their books. The firm showed bulging order books, the factory was running at full capacity, and the profits had never been better.

After seeing the books, he went to the floor of the Osaka exchange and began quietly buying Fukushima Boseki's shares at 20 yen. He kept buying until the price rose to 30 yen. A number of traders had sold the stock short and began to panic. Nomura had bought up most of the available shares, and thus the panic began to drive up the price. Nomura watched the price rise continually from 35 to 50 yen. By the end of 1915 the shares had risen to 100 yen, quintupling his investment.

=== Nomura Securities and later life ===
Nomura formed Nomura Securities in 1925. In 1928, he was appointed to the House of Peers in Japan.
