= Resona Holdings =

Japanese holding company of Resona Group

Resona Holdings, Inc.

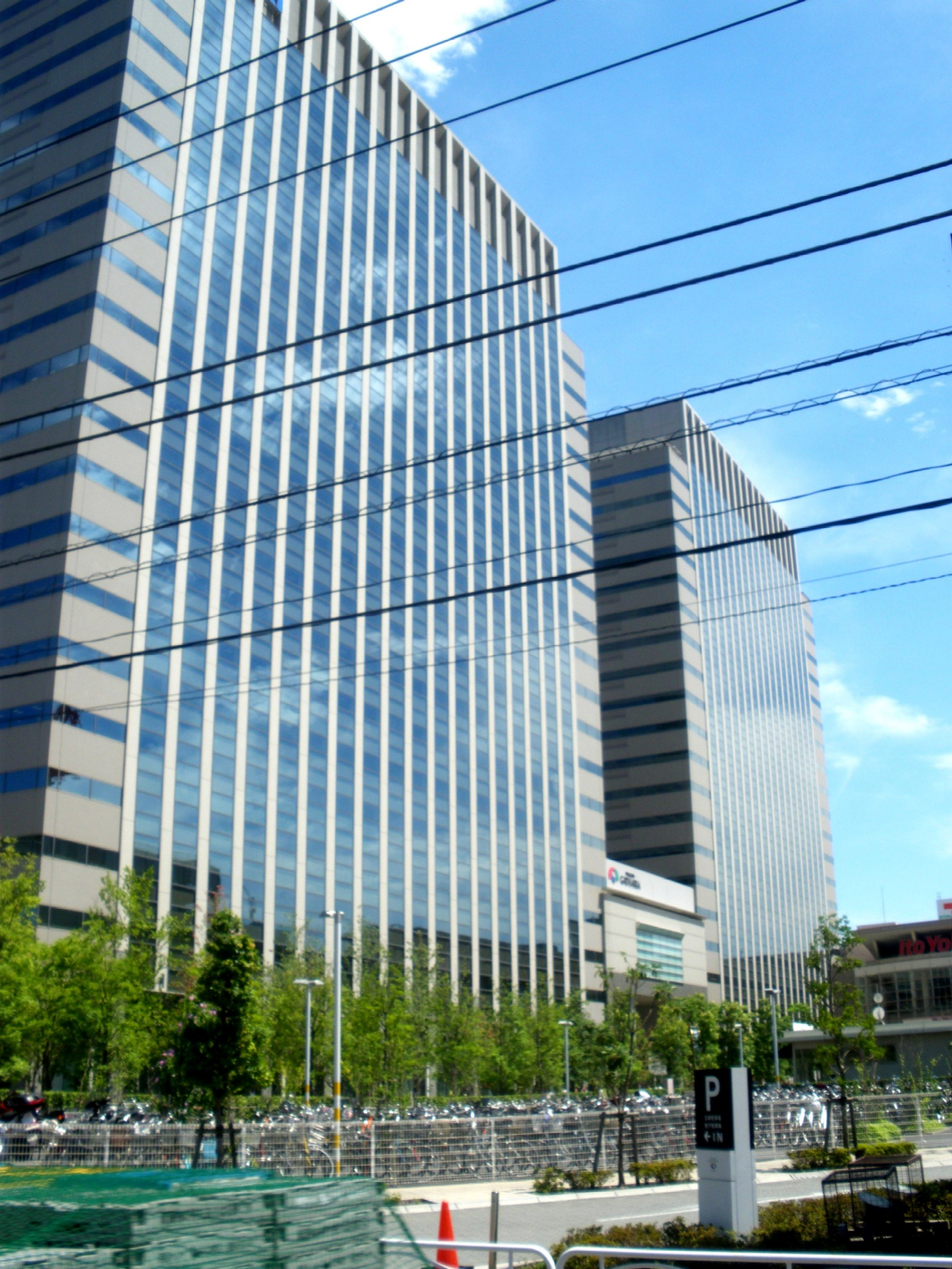
- Resona Holdings headquarters in Koto, Tokyo, Japan
- Native name: 株式会社りそなホールディングス
- Type: Public (K.K)
- Traded as: TYO: 8308
- Industry: Banking
- Founded: 1918; 108 years ago (as the Osaka Nomura Bank); 2002 (as Resona)
- Headquarters: Koto, Tokyo, Japan
- Subsidiaries: Saitama Bank
- Website: www.resona-gr.co.jp

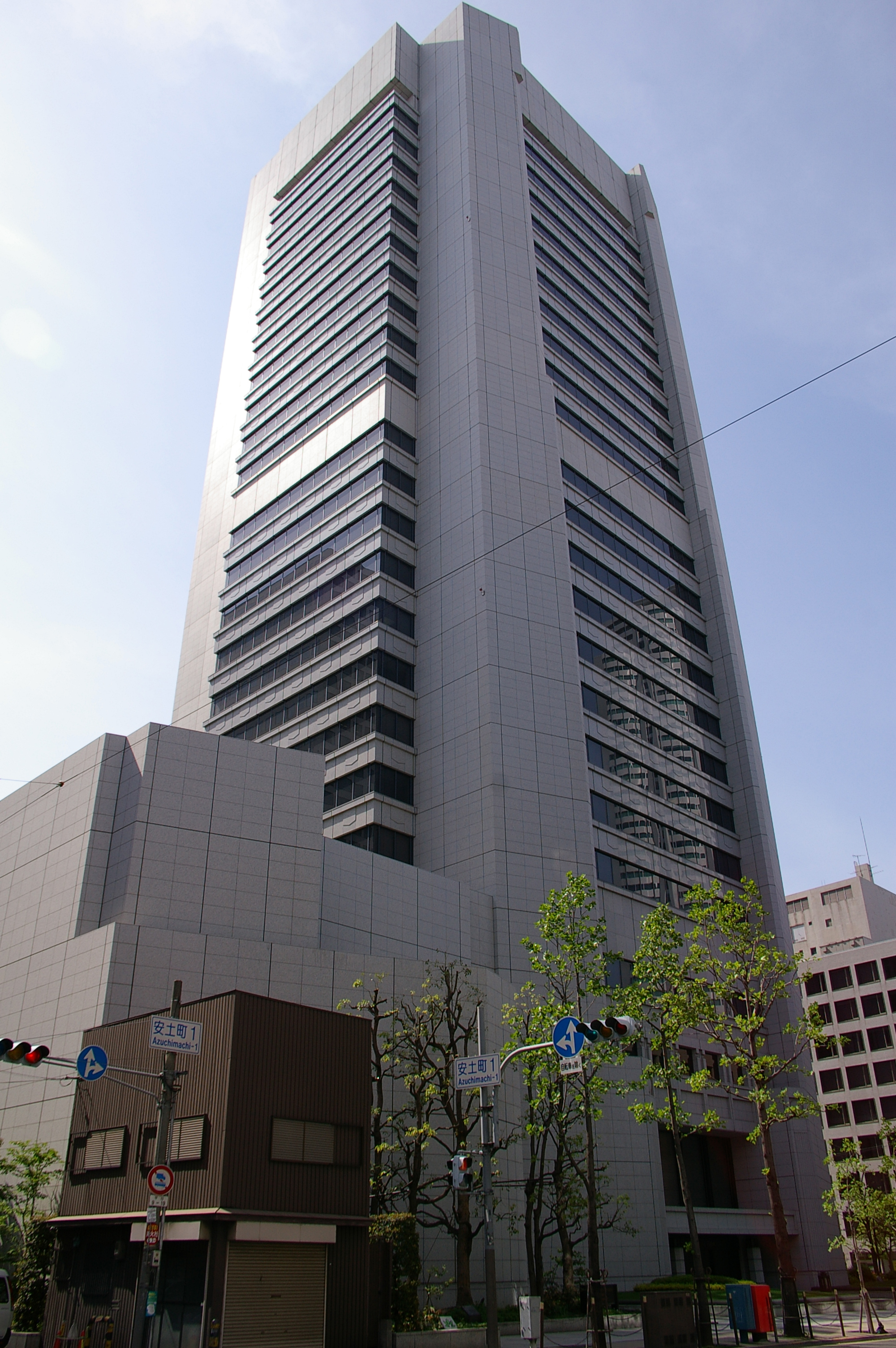
Resona Bank headquarters (former Daiwa Bank headquarters) in Chuo-ku, Osaka, Japan

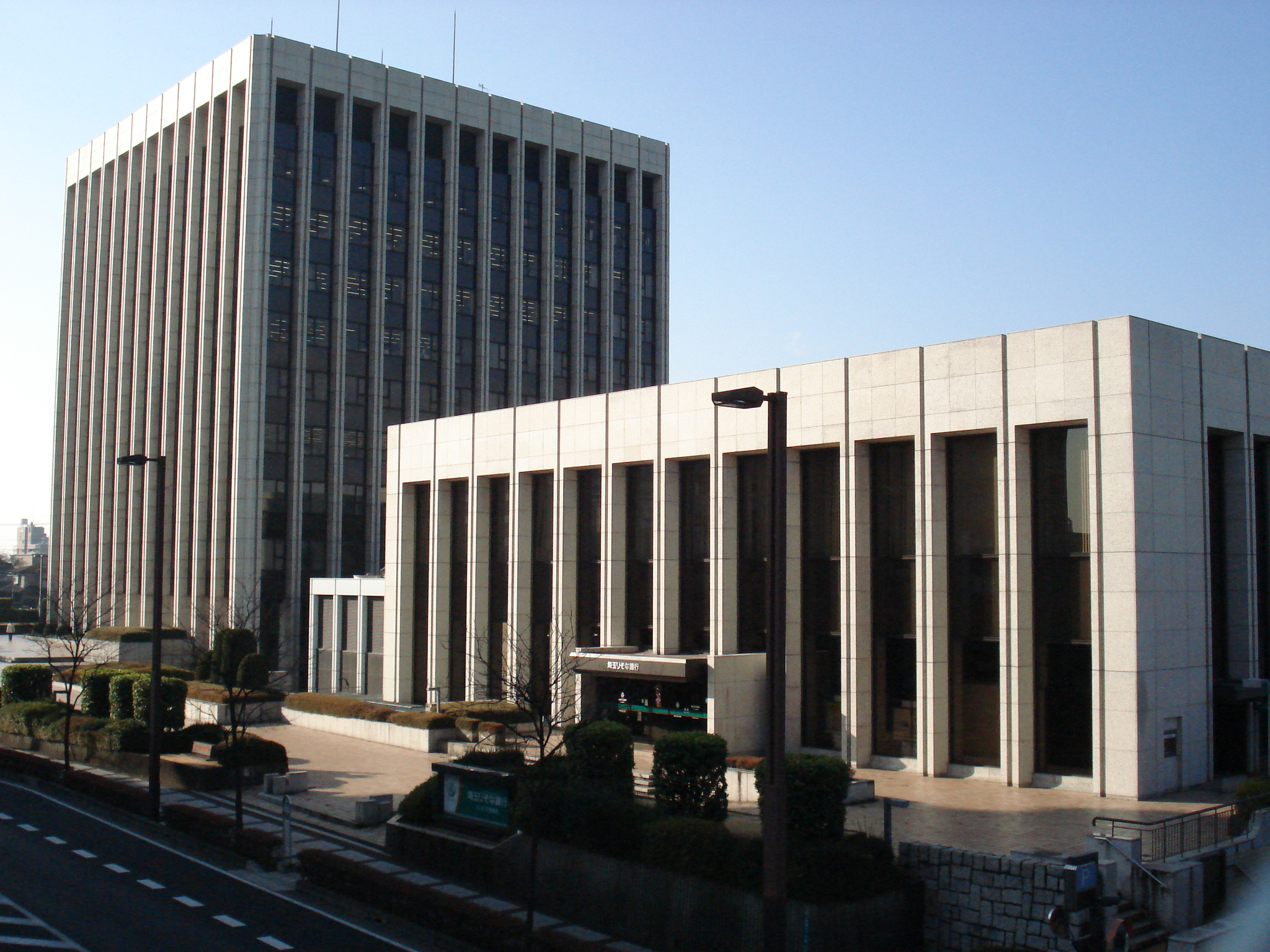
Saitama Resona Bank headquarters (former Saitama Bank headquarters) in Urawa-ku, Saitama, Japan

Resona Holdings, Inc. (株式会社りそなホールディングス, Kabushiki-gaisha Risona Hōrudingusu) (TYO: 8308) is the holding company of Resona Group (りそなグループ, Risona Gurūpu), the fifth-largest banking group in Japan as of 2012. It is headquartered in the Kiba area of Koto, Tokyo. The main operating entities of the group are Resona Bank, a nationwide corporate and retail bank headquartered in Osaka, and Saitama Resona Bank, a smaller bank headquartered in Saitama which primarily serves Saitama Prefecture, and are thus considered to be "city banks" of Japan. Most of these banks' operations are descended from Daiwa Bank and Asahi Bank, which merged in 2003.

== History ==
=== Daiwa Bank ===
Resona was formed as the Osaka Nomura Bank in 1918. This entity served as the financing arm of the Nomura zaibatsu founded by Tokushichi Nomura. Its securities brokerage operation separated in 1925 to form Nomura Securities, now Japan's largest securities company. The bank was renamed Nomura Bank in 1927 and became the main bank for the Osaka Prefecture government in 1929, immediately following the 1929 stock market crash.

The Nomura zaibatsu was dissolved in the wake of World War II, and the bank was renamed to The Daiwa Bank in 1948. It was one of the only major banks that offered both banking and trust services during the postwar era.

In 1995, a New York-based Daiwa bond trader, Toshihide Iguchi, lost $1.1 billion speculating in the bond market and was charged with forgery and falsification of bank records. The bank was criminally indicted in November 1995 and ordered to leave the U.S. market; in the wake of this incident, there were talks of a merger between Daiwa and Sumitomo Bank, which would have created the world's largest bank at the time. Daiwa closed its United States operations in 1996, and eventually pulled out of overseas banking entirely in 1998.

=== Asahi Bank ===
Japan Saving Bank (日本貯蓄銀行) was formed by a 9-bank merger in May 1945 to consolidate various savings banks that served Japanese individuals around the end of World War II. During the immediate postwar era, rapid inflation threatened the bank's business. In 1948, it was converted to an ordinary bank named Kyowa Bank (協和銀行). Kyowa merged with Saitama Bank (埼玉銀行) in 1991 to form Kyowa Saitama Bank (協和埼玉銀行), renamed Asahi Bank (あさひ銀行) in 1992.

Asahi entered into merger talks with Sanwa Bank and Tokai Bank, and the three banks announced a merger in 2001. The merger would have created the third-largest bank in the world behind Deutsche Bank and Mizuho Financial Group. However, Asahi pulled out of these talks later that year. The eventual Sanwa-Tokai merger formed UFJ Bank.

=== Resona merger ===
Daiwa formed a bank holding company, Daiwa Bank Holdings, in December 2001 to serve as the parent entity of Daiwa, Kinki Osaka Bank and Nara Bank. Later that month, Daiwa announced that Asahi Bank would be acquired by Daiwa Bank Holdings in a share swap transaction, forming the fifth-largest banking group in Japan. The company was renamed Resona Holdings, Inc. on 1 October 2002.

Daiwa and Asahi consolidated operations on 1 March 2003, with most of their assets combined to form Resona Bank. 100 Asahi Bank branches in Saitama and three branches in Tokyo were moved to a separate entity, Saitama Resona Bank.

=== Post-merger developments ===
In early 2003, the Resona Group's capital adequacy ratio fell dangerously low. The bank had proposed to maintain its capital adequacy ratio above the legal limit by factoring in deferred tax assets. However, the value of these deferred assets could only be claimed if the company turned a profit in the future. Due to the bank's profit outlook being so dim, Resona's auditor refused to certify the company's financial statement if the deferred tax assets were included. Without being able to count the deferred tax assets, the bank was effectively insolvent.

The Resona case threatened to cripple the entire country's financial system, since the other major banks were also counting on deferred tax assets to maintain their capital adequacy ratios. On 17 May 2003, the Japan government decided to inject 1.96 trillion yen in public funds into the Resona Group through Resona Bank. This move, through the share exchange agreement between the bank and the holding company, effectively nationalized the bank, since the government emerged as the company's majority shareholder, holding 68.25% of voting rights of the holding company, while the holdings of existing shareholders were greatly diluted. The existing management was sacked and a new management was installed.

A Former Resona Chairman, Eiji Hosoya, is credited with leading the bank's revival following the 2003 bailout. Hosoya initially resisted taking the appointment to head Resona, saying in a news conference held on 30 May 2003, "I decided to accept the offer as I realized that stabilizing the financial system is the highest priority for the Japanese economy." Under Hosoya, the bank's new management immediately set about to reduce Resona's non-performing loans (NPLs). In 2004, the company managed to turn a profit of ¥386 billion. As a result, Resona's management announced a plan to, over the next 10 years, return to the government ¥868 billion of the ¥3 trillion in public funds it has received.

Resona introduced two new full-time employee career tracks in 2015: one "no overtime" track for employees seeking better work-life balance, and another track for employees who wish to remain in a single position for their entire career. These policies were unique among Japanese banks at the time of their introduction.

== Group companies ==
- Resona Bank, Limited
- Saitama Resona Bank, Limited
- The Kinki Osaka Bank, Limited
- Resona Trust & Banking Company, Limited
