= List of ASEAN stock exchanges by market capitalization =

This is a list of ASEAN stock exchanges. Those futures exchanges that also offer trading in securities besides trading in futures contracts may be listed both here and in the list of futures exchanges.

There are nine stock exchanges in the ASEAN Exchanges. They are sometimes referred to as the "ASEAN Exchange". Some exchanges do include companies from outside the country where the exchange is located.

== ASEAN stock exchanges ==
Year	Stock exchange	Abb	Region	City	Market cap (USD bn)	Time zone	Δ	Open hours (local time)		
Year	Stock exchange	Abb	Region	City	Market cap (USD bn)	Time zone	Δ	Open	Close	Lunch
2025	Indonesia Stock Exchange	IDX	Indonesia	Jakarta	942.51	WIB	+7:00	09:00	16:00	Yes
2025	Singapore Stock Exchange	STI	Singapore	Singapore	823.76	SST	+8:00	09:00	17:00	Yes
2024	Stock Exchange of Thailand	SET	Thailand	Bangkok	559.22	ICT	+7:00	10:00	16:30	Yes
2025	Bursa Malaysia	FKLCI	Malaysia	Kuala Lumpur	475.74	WPM	+8:00	09:00	16:45	Yes
2025	Philippine Stock Exchange	PSE	Philippines	Metro Manila	318.54	PST	+8:00	09:30	15:30	Yes
2025	Hanoi Stock Exchange	HNX	Vietnam	Hanoi	330.80	ICT	+7:00	09:15	14:30	Yes
2024	Cambodia Securities Exchange	LSX	Cambodia	Phnom Penh	3.20	ICT	+7:00	09:00	15:00	Yes
2025	Yangon Stock Exchange	YSX	Myanmar	Yangon	0.37	BST	+6:30	09:30	15:00	Yes
2025	Lao Securities Exchange	LSX	Laos	Vientiane	0.14	ICT	+7:00	09:00	14:50	Yes

== See also ==
- List of Asian stock exchanges
- List of countries by stock market capitalization
- List of countries without a stock exchange
- List of futures exchanges
- World Federation of Exchanges
