= Lao Securities Exchange =

Laotian primary stock exchange

- Type: Stock exchange
- Location: Vientiane, Laos
- Founded: 11 January 2011
- Key people: Dethphouvang Moularat Chairman
- Currency: Lao Kip
- No. of listings: 11
- Volume: 1.11 trillion kip 12/04/2018 $128.62 Million
- Website: www.lsx.com.la

The Lao Securities Exchange (LSX) is the primary stock exchange in Laos, located in the capital Vientiane. Companies on the LSX have raised more than LAK 6.7 trillion (approximately US$750 million)

== History ==
In 2010, the Lao government sought technical and financial support from South Korea (Korea Exchange has a 49-percent stake in the LSX), as well as advice from neighbouring Thailand, to help build the exchange.

The glass-building cost $10 million to build. It began operations on 11 January 2011.

== Companies ==
There are currently 11 listed companies on the stock exchange:

No.	Issue name	Companies	Number of listed stock
1	BCEL	BANQUE POUR LE COMMERCE EXTERIEUR LAO PUBLIC	207,723,300
2	EDL-Gen	EDL Generation Public Company	1,679,303,697
3	LWPC	LAO WORLD PUBLIC COMPANY	39,560,909
4	PTL	Petroleum Trading Lao Public Company	235,000,000
5	SVN	Souvanny Home Center Public Company	165,000,000
6	PCD	Phousy Construction and Development Public Company	582,000,000
7	LCC	Lao Cement Public Company	40,004,000
8	MHTL	Mahathuen Leasing Public Company	40,000,000
9	LAT	Lao Agrotech Public Company	100,000,000
10	VCL	Vientiane Center Lao Public Company	147,199,900
11	LALCO	Lao ASEAN Leasing Public Company	301,500,000

== Trading times ==
Trading takes place from Monday t Friday with the following trading times:

- Pre-open: 08:30 to 09:00
- Open: 09:00 to 14:50
- Closing auction: 14:50 to 15:00
- Close: 15:00

These times exclude public holidays.

== See also ==
- List of ASEAN stock exchanges by market capitalization
