= Port Moresby Stock Exchange =

Stock exchange in Port Moresby, Papua New Guinea

Port Moresby Stock Exchange (POMSoX) is the principal stock exchange of Papua New Guinea. It is located in Port Moresby and it was founded in 1999.

At the time of its founding POMSox was funded by the Bank of Papua New Guinea, which is the central bank of Papua New Guinea.

According to POMSoX's website, "POMSoX is closely aligned to the Australian Securities Exchange (ASX). The ASX has licensed to POMSoX its Business and Listing Rules. POMSoX procedures are a mirror image of the ASX."

In July 2019, Port Moresby Stock Exchange was renamed to PNGX Markets Limited.

== See also ==
- Economy of Papua New Guinea
- List of East Asian stock exchanges
- List of South Asian stock exchanges
- List of stock exchanges
- List of stock exchanges in the Commonwealth of Nations
