= Limited partnership =

Form of partnership

A limited partnership (LP) is a type of partnership with general partners, who have a right to manage the business, and limited partners, who have no right to manage the business but have only limited liability for its debts. Limited partnerships are distinct from limited liability partnerships in which all partners have limited liability.

The general partners (GPs) are, in all major respects, in the same legal position as partners in a conventional firm: they have management control, share the right to use partnership property, share the profits of the firm in predefined proportions, and have joint and several liability for the debts of the partnership.

As in a general partnership, the GPs have actual authority, as agents of the firm, to bind the partnership in contracts with third parties that are in the ordinary course of the partnership's business. As with a general partnership, "an act of a general partner which is not apparently for carrying on in the ordinary course the limited partnership's activities or activities of the kind carried on by the limited partnership binds the limited partnership only if the act was actually authorized by all the other partners" (i.e., if a general partner does something that is outside the usual business of the limited partnership, the partnership will only be legally bound by that action if all the other partners actually agreed to it).

== Background of limited liability ==
Like shareholders in a corporation, limited partners have limited liability. That means that the limited partners have no management authority and, unless they obligate themselves by a separate contract such as a guarantee, are not liable for the debts of the partnership. The limited partnership provides the limited partners a return on their investment (similar to a dividend), the nature and extent of which is usually defined in the partnership agreement. General Partners thus bear more economic risk than do limited partners, and in cases of financial loss, the GPs are personally liable.

Limited partners are subject to the same alter-ego piercing theories as corporate shareholders. However, it is more difficult to pierce the limited partnership veil because limited partnerships do not have many formalities to maintain. So long as the partnership and the members do not co-mingle funds, it would be difficult to pierce the veil. In some jurisdictions (for instance in the UK), the limited liability of the limited partners is contingent on their not participating in management.

Partnership interests (including the interests of limited partners) are afforded a significant level of protection through the charging order mechanism. The charging order limits the creditor of a debtor-partner or a debtor-member to the debtor's share of distributions, without conferring on the creditor any voting or management rights.

When the partnership is being constituted, or the composition of the firm is changing, limited partnerships are generally required to file documents with the relevant state registration office. Limited partners must explicitly disclose their status when dealing with other parties, so that such parties are on notice that the individual negotiating with them carries limited liability. It is customary that the documentation and electronic materials issued to the public by the firm will carry a clear statement identifying the legal nature of the firm and listing the partners separately as general and limited. Hence, unlike the GPs, the limited partners do not have inherent agency authority to bind the firm unless they are subsequently held out as agents (and so create an agency by estoppel); or acts of ratification by the firm create ostensible authority.

== History ==
The societates publicanorum, which arose in Rome in the third century BC, may have arguably been the earliest form of limited partnership. During the heyday of the Roman Empire, they were roughly equivalent to today's corporations. Some had many investors, and interests were publicly tradable. However, they required at least one (and often several) partners with unlimited liability. A very similar form of partnership was present in Arabia at the time of the coming of Islam (c. 700CE) and this became codified into Islamic law as the qirad.

=== Development in early modern Europe ===
In medieval Italy, a business organization known as the commenda appeared in the 10th century that was generally used for financing maritime trade. In a commenda, the traveling trader of the ship had limited liability, and was not held responsible if money was lost as long as the trader had not violated the rules of the contract. In contrast, his investment partners on land had unlimited liability and were exposed to risk. A commenda was not a common form for a long-term business venture as most long-term businesses were still expected to be secured against the assets of their individual proprietors. As an institution, the commenda is very similar to the qirad, but whether the qirad transformed into the commenda or the two institutions evolved independently cannot be stated with certainty.

In the Mongol Empire, the contractual features of a Mongol-ortoq partnership closely resembled that of qirad and commenda arrangements, but Mongol investors were not constrained using uncoined precious metals and tradable goods for partnership investments and executed money-lending. Moreover, Mongol elites formed trade partnerships with merchants from Italian cities, including Marco Polo's family.

Colbert's Ordinance (1673) and the Napoleonic Code (1807) reinforced the limited partnership concept under European law. In the United States, limited partnerships became widely available in the early 19th century, although a number of legal restrictions at the time made them unpopular for business ventures. Britain enacted its first limited partnership statute in 1907.

== Worldwide ==
=== Denmark ===
A kommanditselskab (abbreviated K/S) is the Danish equivalent of the limited partnership. The owners are divided into general partners (komplementarer in Danish) and limited partners (kommanditister in Danish). Often, the only general partner of a K/S is an Anpartsselskab with the least possible capital, thus reducing the liability of the K/S to the capital of the Anpartsselskab.

=== Germany ===
Kommanditgesellschaft auf Aktien – abbreviated KGaA – is a German corporate designation standing for 'partnership limited by shares', a form of corporate organization roughly equivalent to a master limited partnership. A Kommanditgesellschaft auf Aktien has two types of participators. It has at least one partner with unlimited liability (Komplementär). It is in that sense a private company. Komplementärs are natural persons or legal persons. If the Komplementär is a corporation with limited liability then the type of the company has to be named as UG (haftungsbeschränkt) & Co. KGaA, GmbH & Co. KGaA, AG & Co. KGaA or SE & Co. KGaA. Under consideration of the aspects of European freedom of establishment it is also possible that corporations established under foreign law can become Komplementärs of a KGaA forming companies like Limited & Co. KGaA.

The investment of the partners with limited liability (Kommanditisten) is the stock of the company (Grundkapital) and divided into shares. A KGaA is in that aspect comparable with a German Aktiengesellschaft.

The investment of all partners is the corporate's total capital (Gesamtkapital). The KGaA is a traditional type of very large family businesses (that are partly publicly traded) in Germany; the consumer products giant Henkel, pharmaceutical company Merck and media conglomerate Bertelsmann are prominent examples. In case of Merck, besides the owning family Merck also the members of the executive board are fully and privately liable for the company (including a period after withdrawal). Also the German football club Borussia Dortmund uses this corporate organization (as Borussia Dortmund GmbH & Co KGaA) for its professional football team as part of its compliance with the "50+1 rule".

=== Hong Kong ===
Hong Kong offers two forms of limited partnerships, namely limited partnerships governed by the Limited Partnership Ordinance and limited partnership funds, known as "LPFs", governed by the Securities and Futures Ordinance. Neither limited partnerships nor LPFs are separate and distinct legal persons. Instead, they are simply partnerships of persons, some of whom enjoy limited liability as a result of compliance with statutory requirements. Like many other jurisdictions, the partners who enjoy such limited liability are known as limited partners and their limited liability is contingent upon them not taking an active role in the management of the partnership.

LPFs were introduced in 2020 and are intended to provide a domestic Hong Kong vehicle for private equity funds.

=== Japan ===
Japanese law has historically provided for two business forms similar to limited partnerships:

- Goshi gaisha, a form of close corporation (mochibun kaisha) with unlimited liability for certain shareholders
- Tokumei kumiai (lit. "anonymous partnerships"), a form of partnership in which non-operating partners have limited liability so long as they remain anonymous

In 1999, the Diet of Japan passed legislation enabling the formation of "limited partnerships for investment" (投資事業有限責任組合, tōshi jigyō yūgen sekinin kumiai). These are very similar to Anglo-American limited partnerships, in that they adopt most provisions of general partnership law but provide for limited liability for certain partners. Profits of an investment limited partnership pass through to all partners proportional to their investment share. For tax purposes, profits and losses will pass through only to the general partner(s) while the partnership has negative equity (i.e. liabilities exceeding assets); however, profits and losses while the partnership has positive equity are shared equally.

=== New Zealand ===
In New Zealand, limited partnerships are a form of partnership involving general partners (who are liable for all the debts and liabilities of the partnership) and limited partners (who are liable to the extent of their capital contribution to the partnership). The Limited Partnerships Act 2008 replaces special partnerships that exist under Part 2 of the Partnership Act 1908. Special partnerships are considered obsolete as they do not provide the appropriate structure preferred by foreign venture capital investors.

Features of limited partnerships include:

- a list of activities that the limited partners can be involved in while not participating in the management of the limited partnership (safe-harbour activities)
- an indefinite lifespan if desired
- separate legal personality
- tax treatment for limited partnerships.

The registers of limited partnerships and overseas limited partnerships are administered by the Companies Office.

=== United Kingdom ===
Limited Partnerships Act 1907 (Note: Section 1.)
- Act of Parliament
- Parliament of the United Kingdom
- Long title: An Act to establish Limited Partnerships.
- Citation: 7 Edw. 7. c. 24
- Territorial extent: United Kingdom

Dates
- Royal assent: 28 August 1907
- Commencement: 1 January 1908 (Note: Section 2.)
Other legislation
| Amended by | Companies (Consolidation) Act 1908; Perjury Act 1911 |

Status: Amended

Text of statute as originally enacted

Revised text of statute as amended

Text of the Limited Partnerships Act 1907 as in force today (including any amendments) within the United Kingdom, from legislation.gov.uk.

In the United Kingdom, limited partnerships are governed by the Limited Partnerships Act 1907 and, on matters on which that act is silent, also by the Partnership Act 1890. The UK Department for Business, Enterprise and Regulatory Reform (now the Department for Business and Trade) consulted in 2008 on proposals to modify and merge the two acts, but the proposals did not go ahead.

Scots law on partnerships (including limited partnerships) is distinct from English law. Under Scots law, partnerships are legal persons distinct from the partners. However, lawsuits may still be filed against the partners by name, the general partners are still exposed to 'pass-through' liability, and partners are still jointly and severally liable (although in the case of limited partners, only to the extent of their capital contribution). There has been discussion over whether limited partnerships operating under English law should be made separate legal entities as under Scots law, and in the same way as limited liability partnerships are. The Law Commission report on partnership law LC283 suggested that creation of separate legal personality should be left as an option for the partners to decide upon when a partnership is formed. There were concerns that automatically making partnerships separate legal entities would restrict their ability to trade in some European countries and also expose them to different tax regimes than expected.

Legislative Reform (Private Fund Limited Partnerships) Order 2017
- Statutory Instrument
- Parliament of the United Kingdom
- Citation: SI 2017/514

Dates
- Made: 29 March 2017
- Commencement: 6 April 2017
Other legislation
| Made under | Legislative and Regulatory Reform Act 2006 |

Text of statute as originally enacted

The Legislative Reform (Private Fund Limited Partnerships) Order 2017 (SI 2017/514) made provision for partners to register their limited partnership as a "Private Fund Limited Partnership" (PFLP), which is available for collective investment schemes constituted by an agreement in writing. The order relaxed the rules applying to private fund partnerships in order to remove some uncertainty in the application of the law, reduce administrative costs, and help ensure "that the UK remains an attractive and competitive location for private investment funds in comparison to other jurisdictions". The relaxation of the law in relation to PFLPs was welcomed by the financial industry.

=== United States ===
In the United States, the limited partnership organization is most common among film production companies and real estate investment projects, or in types of businesses that focus on a single or limited-term project. They are also useful in "labor-capital" partnerships, where one or more financial backers prefer to contribute money or resources while the other partner performs the actual work. In such situations, liability is the driving concern behind the choice of limited partnership status. The limited partnership is also attractive to firms wishing to provide shares to many individuals without the additional tax liability of a corporation. Private equity companies almost exclusively use a combination of general and limited partners for their investment funds. Well-known limited partnerships include Enterprise Products and Blackstone Group (both of which are public companies), and Bloomberg L.P. (a private company).

Before 2001, the limited liability enjoyed by limited partners was contingent upon their refraining from taking any active role in the management of the firm. However, Section 303 of the Revised Uniform Limited Partnership Act (if adopted by a state legislature) eliminates the so-called "control rule" with respect to personal liability for entity obligations and brings limited partners into parity with LLC members, LLP partners and corporate shareholders.

The 2001 amendments to the Uniform Limited Partnership Act (to the extent the amendments are adopted by state legislature) also permitted limited partnerships to become limited liability limited partnerships in states that adopt the change. Under this form, debts of a limited liability limited partnership are solely the responsibility of the partnership, thereby removing general-partner liability for partnership obligations. This change was made in response to the common practice of naming a limited-liability entity as a 1% general partner that controlled the limited partnership and organizing the managers as limited partners. This practice granted a general partner de facto limited liability under the partnership structure.

== See also ==
- Master limited partnership
