= List of countries without a stock exchange =

This is a list of sovereign states without a stock exchange.

== List ==
Country	Continent
Afghanistan	Asia
Andorra	Europe
Antigua and Barbuda	North America
Belize	North America
Benin	Africa
Brunei	Asia
Burkina Faso	Africa
Burundi	Africa
Central African Republic	Africa
Chad	Africa
Comoros	Africa
Cuba	North America
Democratic Republic of Congo	Africa
Djibouti	Africa
Dominica	North America
Equatorial Guinea}	Africa
Eritrea	Africa
Gabon	Africa
Gambia	Africa
Grenada	North America
Guinea	Africa
Guinea Bissau	Africa
Haiti	North America
Kiribati	Oceania
Liberia	Africa
Liechtenstein	Europe
Madagascar	Africa
Mali	Africa
Marshall Islands	Oceania
Mauritania	Africa
Federated States of Micronesia	Oceania
Monaco	Europe
Nauru	Oceania
Niger	Africa
North Korea	Asia
Palau	Oceania
Republic of Congo	Africa
Saint Lucia	North America
Saint Vincent and the Grenadines	North America
Samoa	Oceania
San Marino	Europe
São Tomé and Príncipe	Africa
Senegal	Africa
Sierra Leone	Africa
Solomon Islands	Oceania
South Sudan	Africa
Timor-Leste	Asia
Togo	Africa
Tonga	Oceania
Tuvalu	Oceania
Vanuatu	Oceania
Vatican City	Europe
Yemen	Asia

== By region ==
=== Territories ===
The following de facto states do not maintain stock exchanges:

- Abkhazia
- Kosovo
- Northern Cyprus
- Sahrawi Arab Democratic Republic
- Somaliland
- South Ossetia
- Transnistria

=== Caribbean ===
The following Caribbean countries are served by the Eastern Caribbean Securities Exchange (ECSE), based in Basseterre, Saint Kitts and Nevis, and therefore there is no individual stock exchange on their territories:

- Anguilla (BOT)
- Antigua and Barbuda
- Dominica
- Grenada
- Montserrat (BOT)
- Saint Lucia
- Saint Vincent and the Grenadines

=== Central Africa ===
The following Central African countries are served by the Bourse des valeurs mobilières de l'Afrique centrale (BVMAC), based in Douala, Cameroon, and therefore there is no individual stock exchange on their territories:

- Republic of Congo
- Equatorial Guinea
- Chad
- Gabon
- Central African Republic

=== West Africa ===
The following West African countries are served by the Bourse Régionale des Valeurs Mobilières (BVRM), based in Abidjan, Côte d'Ivoire, and therefore there is no individual stock exchange on their territories:

- Benin
- Burkina Faso
- (Guinea-Bissau) Guinea Bissau
- Mali
- Niger
- Senegal
- Togo

== See also ==
- List of ASEAN stock exchanges by market capitalization
- List of stock exchanges
- Stock exchanges of small economies
