= List of stock exchanges in Oceania =

Oceania

This is a list of active stock exchanges in Oceania.

== Stock Exchanges in Oceania ==
Economy	Exchange	Location	Founded	Link	Technology	Operating MIC
Australia	Sydney Stock Exchange	Sydney	1997		Nasdaq X-stream	APXL
Australia	Australian Securities Exchange	Sydney	1987	ASX	Nasdaq Genium INET	XASX
Australia	Cboe Australia	Sydney	2008	CXA	Cboe Titanium	CHIA
Australia	National Stock Exchange of Australia	Sydney	1937	NSX	Nasdaq X-stream	XNEC
Fiji	South Pacific Stock Exchange	Suva	1971	SPX		XSPS
New Zealand	New Zealand's Exchange	Wellington	2002	NZX	Nasdaq X-stream	XNZE
Papua New Guinea	PNGX Markets Limited	Port Moresby	1999	PNGX	Nasdaq Matching Engine	XPOM

== See also ==
- List of stock exchanges
