= Economic history of Venice =

Venice, which is situated at the north end of the Adriatic Sea, was for hundreds of years the richest and most powerful centre of Europe, the reason being that it gained large-scale profits from the adjacent middle European markets. Venice was the major centre of trade with the Arabs and indirectly the Indians during the Middle Ages. It also served as origin of the economic development and integration of the rest of Europe during the Middle Ages.

Venetian might reached its peak during the 15th century when the city-state monopolized the spice trade from India, through the Arab lands, using exclusive trade agreements. This prompted the Spanish and the Portuguese to embark on the search for the new route to India, leading to the discovery of the Americas and the start of the modern age.

Nevertheless, only the nobility or patriciate had the right to exercise the wealth-bringing long-distance trade. It was the same patriciate that erected a monopoly of political leadership. It left production and small business to the strata of its society that were not capable of becoming a member of the council - which was the visible sign of nobility. On the other hand, they provided protection against competitors, against violation of secrecy - and exercised strict control.

== Introduction ==
Venice's historical roots rest as far back as the Etruscan Culture. The settlements from which later on Venice grew up, could revive the late Roman trade with Northern Italy. Crusades and the conquest of the Byzantine Capital opened the direct ways to the East and far into Asia. But these voyages, similar to the costly convoys to Flanders, Tunisia, Syria and Constantinople, required huge amounts of capital, which normally means credit.

The crusades brought intensification of trade, of which Venice took profit so that it soon ranked first among the trading nations. Already a century before the sack of Constantinople (1204) many traders' colonies flourished. This provided (especially when keeping in mind the Venetian conquest of Crete and other important points) the backbone of free trade and of the convoys of large ships sent to the markets around the Mediterranean sea. In addition it offered many opportunities to regulate the local balances of power and secured partly the means of living - especially wheat - for the mother town.

Money in its core in those days mostly consisted of gold or silver. As a consequence the economy depended heavily on the timely afflux and efflux of these metals. So Venice had to develop a highly flexible system of currencies and change rates between coins consisting of silver and gold, if it wanted to preserve and enhance its role as platform and turntable of international trading. In addition the change rates between the currencies circulating within Venice and outside had to be adjusted adequately. On the other hand, the nobility had hardly any scruples to force its colonies to accept change rates, which were only useful for the fisk.

In addition Italian traders were used to means of payment, which could help avoiding transportation of gold and silver which were expensive and dangerous. Crediting became a way to bridge the ubiquitous lack of noble metals, and at the same time, to accelerate goods turnover, were it with the help of a simple bank transfer, were it with the aid of a bill of exchange. Also available and helpful were to float loans, used as a kind of traders' money, circulating from hand to hand. Cambists played an important role just as well as the later state-controlled banks whose predecessors in Venice was the "wheat chamber" or Camera frumenti.

Despite the predominance of intermediary trade, ship building was an industry of utmost importance right from the beginning - and it was by far the most important employer. Quite important in the later Middle Ages were the production of drapery, of silk and glass. Still the salt monopoly was of utmost importance, even more so the trade of wheat and millet. This trade did not contribute less to the wealth of the patriciate than the abundant rest of the trade.

In early Modern Times the power of Venice reached its climax, but the tiny super power was unable to confront the enormous powers of the Ottomans and of Spain with their gigantic resources. By and by Venice lost its colonies and its monopoly for the trade in the Adriatic Sea. In addition capital of the Netherlands and of England overran the Venetian competitors, as they did not accept any Venetian trade monopolies and trade moved into the North Atlantic. In addition market access became ever more difficult because protectionism became rampant in most Mediterranean and European states.

Close to the end, the Venetian state became a conservative agrarian system, which, despite increasing tourism, met incomprehension. There was no broad decadence but a slow recidivism behind the expanding trade powers of the 18th century.

== Until the 9th century ==
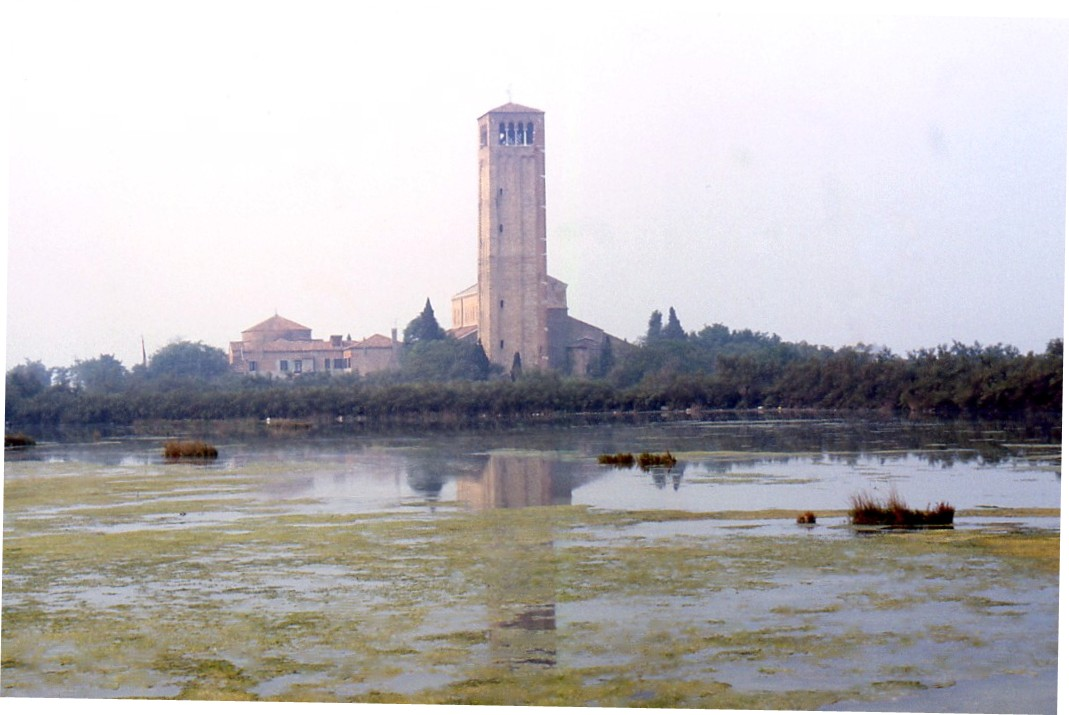
The cathedral of today's nearly uninhabited Torcello

In antiquity the sea level was a few metres lower than today. Greek and Etrurian traces reveal much earlier settlements than expected. Chioggia (Clodia) was a Roman military colony and in the Fontego dei Turchi above the Canal Grande a coin from the days of emperor Trajan was found.

At the latest during the 6th century fishery, but overall sea salt and grain played the major roles. At about 750 King Aistulf of the Longobards prohibited trade with the Byzantine subjects - that means obviously with the people of the lagoon as well.

Around 780 traders at Pavia offered goods such as Tyrian purple from the orient. Before 785 already, Venetian traders resided in Ravenna and in the so-called Pentapolis, men that had been "expelled" by the Franks in 787/791. About thirty years earlier they did appear in the slave trade with the saracenes.

Trading mostly meant drapery. Obviously coins and coinage were common - e.g. coins of emperor Louis the Pious were in use, but stamped with "Venecia" on the reverse -, but Venetians preferred the coins of Verona, although a Venetian zecca (Arabian word for coin) is verifiable for the ninth century already.

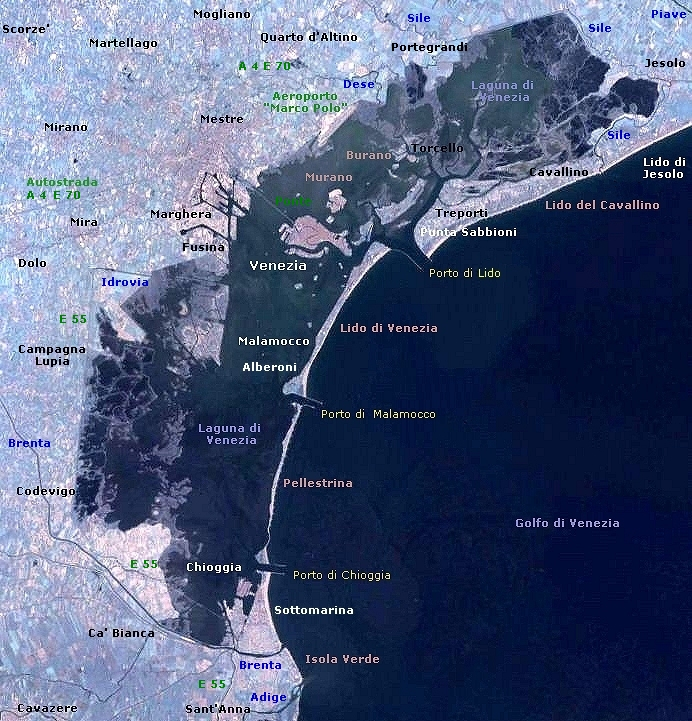
Today's lagoon

The early emporium of Torcello was soon replaced by Malamocco, later by Rialto. The nuclei around Olivolo, San Marco and Rialto made up three foci, one concentrated on ship building arsenal, one as political centre, one as centre of trade and exchange.

The early phase of "feudalization" together with the acquisition of wide real estates, brought huge amounts of capital to certain families. The last will of the doge Giustiniano Participazio from 829 demonstrates, to which amount these families did invest their revenues into buildings, goods and adornments, but the more it is astonishing that they invested even more in credits and trading companies. The leading stratum was obviously involved in trading very heavily, much more than the nobility of the neighbouring mainland.

== Between Byzantium and the Holy Roman Empire: 9th century to 1171/1204 ==
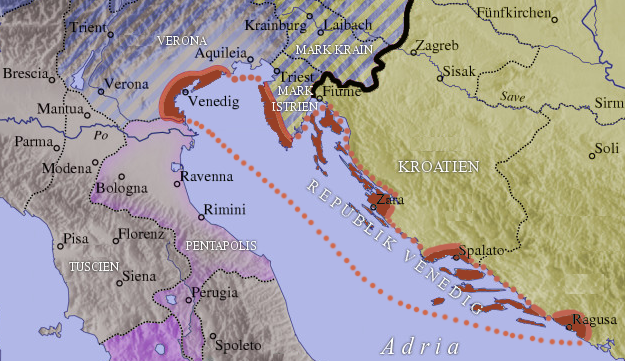
Venetian territory around 1000

With the destruction of Comacchio (883) that controlled the mouth of the Po River, Venetians liberated the trade till Pavia and Piacenza – the more as a treaty with Charles "the Fat" had opened his Realm. Much more difficult was the relation to Istria and even more Dalmatia, where the Narentani, pirates of the Dalmatian coast resisted until 1000, when doge Pietro II Orseolo conquered the northern and central part of the region.

Privileges in the Holy Empire worked well together in combination with supremacy in the Adriatic Sea and a chart of the Byzantine Emperor of 992. In compensation for military aid against the Arabs of southern Italy, the Byzantine emperor Basil II had reduced the tax for the ships by half. In addition Venetians started trade with Tunisia and Alexandria in Egypt where they delivered wood, weapons, metal and slaves, even though the trade with Islam was sometimes banned. Emperor Leo V (813–820) had already forbidden this trade.

Venice played an important role in Byzantine trade, as a commercial outlet and a supply center to the empire. Byzantine exports, such as luxury silk cloth, spices, precious metals - went through Venice, and from Venice, slaves, salt, and wood were shipped towards Byzantium and the Muslim Levant. After the 9th century, however, Venice became increasingly independent from the Byzantine Empire.

The Golden Bull of 1082, issued by Alexios I Komnenos in return for their defense of the Adriatic Sea against the Normans, granted Venetian merchants with duty-free trading rights, exempt from tax, throughout the Byzantine Empire in 23 of the most important Byzantine ports, guaranteed them property-right protections from Byzantine administrators, and given them buildings and wharfs within Constantinople. These concessions greatly expanded Venetian trading activity throughout the Eastern Mediterranean.

In the Holy Land, which was conquered by the Crusaders at about 1098, Venice gained the right of free trade, because it had helped Gottfried von Bouillon in 1100 and he subsequently conquered Tyros, the trade central in Syria. The colonies enjoyed autarchy and autarky. From Syria to Little Armenia they conducted their trade deep into Asia, with future colonies being eyed in Alexandria and the Maghrib.

The counterpart of the privilege of 1258 became the one of 1084 that emperor Henry IV ceded for his whole realm. Deeply mired in the Investiture Controversy he allowed Venetians to trade in his whole realm, but his subjects were not allowed to extend their trading activities over Venice. Together with the monopoly in the Adriatic Sea and the staple, and the fact that merchants could only trade in Venice with the intermediates that the city provided, Venice was on the way to monopolizing trade between West and East. The merchants of the 1082 Holy Empire had to reside in the Fondaco dei Tedeschi, where control was intense.

=== Sudden wealth and feudal way of living ===
Having conquered Constantinople and built a colonial empire, Venice was the predominant power in the eastern Mediterranean – with Genoa as enemy. This predominance formed the political frame together with the Latin Empire (1204–61), which allowed a massive expansion of trade. In addition, the merchants participated in growing trade with the Holy Land, where Acre played the main role until 1291.

Trade alone was unable to account for such large amounts of capital, necessary to support not only numerous nobles, but also Populari grassi, men who had grown rich very fast, acquired estates on the Terraferma. Although the old clans tried to prevent this development, they could not stop it. Huge amounts were invested this way, although the towns on the mainland objected to these intrusions.

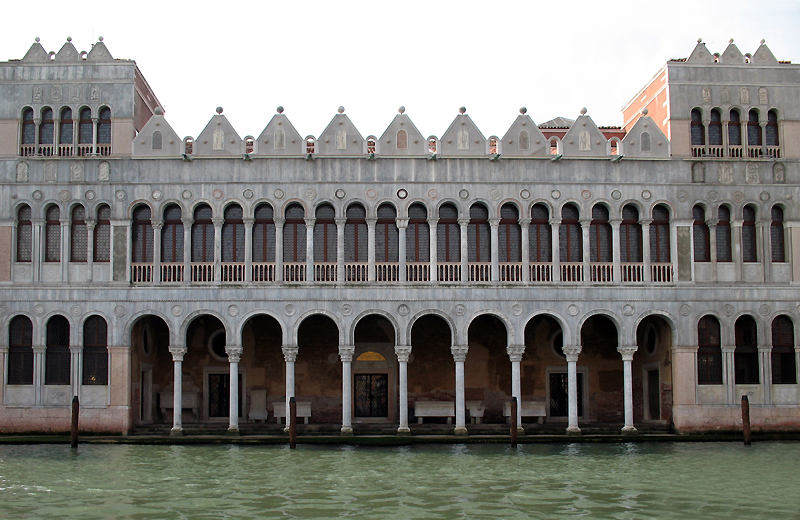
The oldest palace, the later Fontego dei Turchi

Thanks to the gigantic wealth of populari and grandi, only casual conflicts occurred. The two strata converged to only one, whose members were regarded as the Magni. They held the political power and monopolized the profits of long-distance trade. Pressure was further reduced by sending 3,000 to 4,000 men and their families to Crete. Some of the nobles conquered little empires of their own in the Aegean; many of them were sent as placeholders to hundreds of military and administrative posts.

The Venetian empire reached from Venice to Crete. Its centre point was the Golden Horn. Although Venice was completely unable to conquer the three eighths of the old empire that the crusaders had conceded to Enrico Dandolo, it secured strategic points.

=== Forms of company ===
The typical form of company was the so-called Collegantia. Within its frame a silent partner introduced about three quarters of the capital investment, the active partner, who conducted the trade, introduced the rest. Aims, responsibility assignment and shares were fixed before the journey being started, but the active partner could also reinvest his gains during the same journey. In a way silent and active partner were only roles that were fixed before each adventure, in which several silent partners could dare their luck. This way the risks diminished and the opportunities to accumulate capital increased. Close relationships and dependencies were developed and as a consequence family partnerships were largely preferred.

Not before the Late Middle Ages – and thus very late in comparison to Tuscany - veritable societates prevailed, companies conceived for longer periods. In addition double-entry bookkeeping enhanced the possibilities to stretch initiatives into rather far away countries by founding outposts or factories, and by enhancing controlling. Directing activities and intensification of local contacts were facilitated this way, too.

== Venice as key of world trade between 13th and 15th century ==
The Arab conquest of Jerusalem caused a long lasting deviation of trade routes to Baghdad and Tabriz. Cilician Armenia was now the main hub of trade. In addition the Venetians lost their main ports in Egypt and in 1291 also the most important Acre.

They could only try to make their way through Armenia, Persia, Turkestan. After long and difficult negotiations they were re-admitted in Byzantium.

This was very important in so far as sailing through the Bosporus was now the most important way to reach Central Asia. It was not by coincidence that Marco Polo travelled through Asia in these years between 1278 and 1291. A second way led to Trabzon further to the Persian Gulf to India, a third one from Tana at the mouth of the river Don to the Volga and the Caspian Sea to India.

But the larger part of trade was conducted by sea-vessels and not overland. Venice so developed a system of regular convoys with strong protective means, but also encouraged private trading.

== Salt trade ==
The Republic of Venice was active in the production and trading of salt, salted products, and other products along trade routes established by the salt trade. Venice produced its own salt at Chioggia by the seventh century for trade, but eventually moved on to buying and establishing salt production throughout the Eastern Mediterranean. Venetian merchants bought salt and acquired salt production from Egypt, Algeria, the Crimean peninsula, Sardinia, Ibiza, Crete, and Cyprus. The establishment of these trade routes also allow Venetian merchants to pick up other valuable cargo, such as Indian spices, from these ports for trade. They then sold or supplied salt and other goods to cities in the Po Valley - Piacenza, Parma, Reggio, Bologna, among others - in exchange for salami, prosciutto, cheese, soft wheat, and other goods. Venetian exporters were obligated to import salt into Venice, for which they were paid a subsidy - the ordo salis. The Venetian state then resold the salt at a profit - a form of Salt tax - to markets throughout Italy, Dalmatia, Slovenia, and the Stato da mar. Venice had a salt monopoly for many of these markets. The Salt Office collected 165,000 ducats net of costs in 1464, or around 15% of the entire income of the Venetian state.

== Decline ==
According to Diego Puga and Daniel Trefler, the Serrata del Maggior Consiglio (which made the parliamentary participation hereditary) led to barriers to participation in the most profitable aspects of long-distance trade. This diminished the ability of those outside of the hereditary aristocracy to participate in political decisions and in economic processes such as the colleganza. This stratification in political and economic power led to a fundamental shift from political openness, economic competition, and social mobility to political closure, extreme economic inequality, and social stratification and stiffness.

According to economic historian Jan De Vries, Venice's economic power in the Mediterranean had declined significantly by the start of the 17th century. De Vries attributes this decline to the loss of the spice trade, a declining uncompetitive textile industry, competition in book publishing due to a rejuvenated Catholic Church, the adverse impact of the Thirty Years' War on Venice's key trade partners, and the increasing cost of cotton and silk imports to Venice.

== Immigration ==
The population of Venice – maybe 85,000 to 100,000 at about 1300 – could only bear these permanent losses, because there was also a permanent influx. This influx was heavily encouraged by Venetian officials, especially after the waves of Black Death after 1348. Specialists like silk weavers from Lucca or mill builders and bakers of the Holy Roman Empire migrated in droves. Consequently, Venice was forced to expand within its narrow territory, so gardens and swamps were largely replaced by dwellings.

Large numbers of people also immigrated from Tuscany, especially from Florence, as well as southern Italy, Greece, Croatia and even France. From about 1250 an increasing number of people came from the Holy Roman Empire – Germans, Hungarians or Bohemians – called "tedeschi". They dwelled in the Fondaco dei Tedeschi and they were helped and controlled by Visdomini del Fondaco. Official brokers or middle-men were the only ones who were allowed to buy and sell the products.

Also immigrating to Venice, the Jewish people offered much more and cheaper credit to the Venetians, but most of them lived in Mestre. However, with the foundation of the Ghetto in 1516, the majority of the Jewish people started to live in secluded quarters, locked up at night.
