= Commenda =

Medieval contract

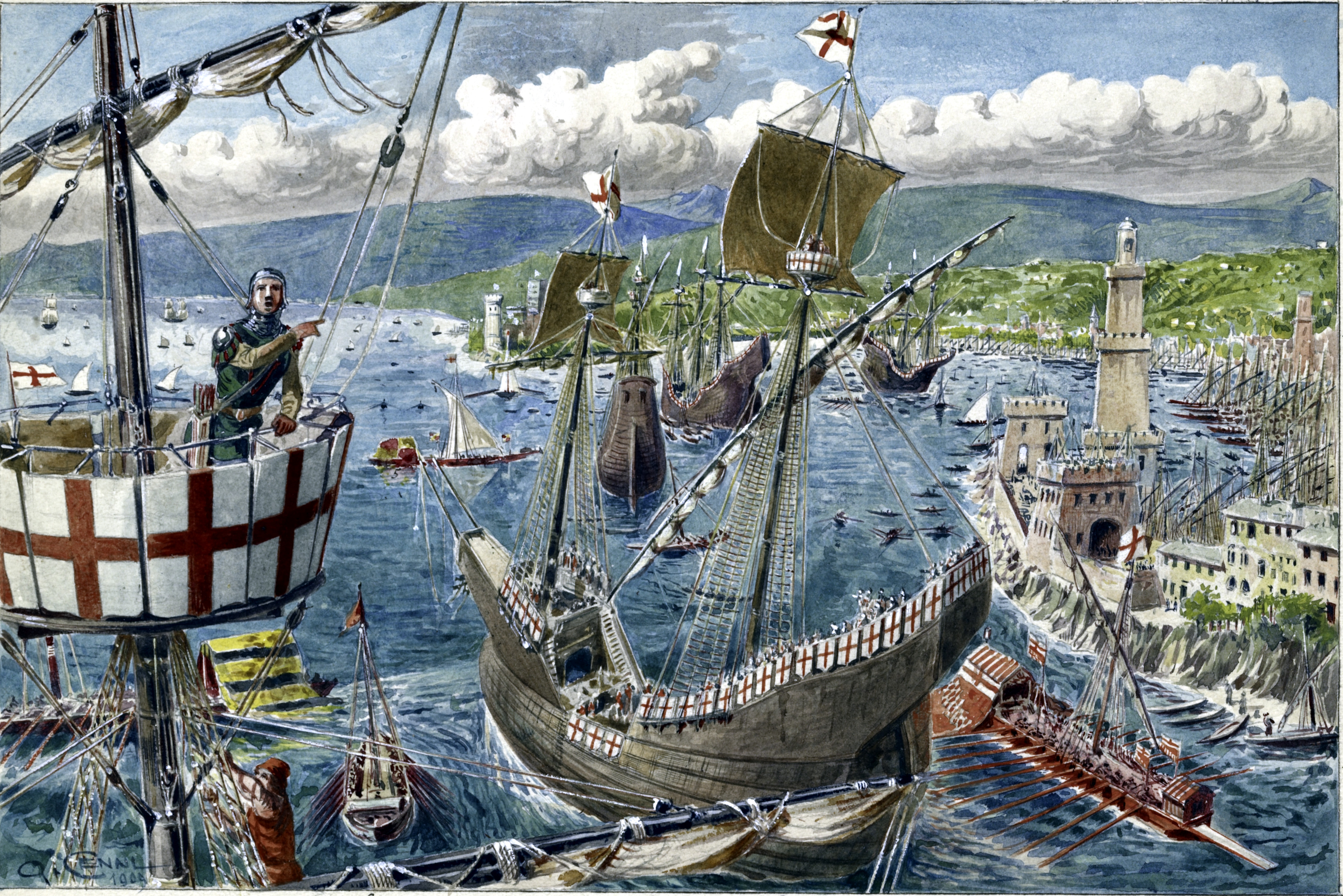
The port and fleet of Genoa, early 14th century

The commenda was a medieval contract which developed in Italy around the 13th century, and was an early form of limited partnership. The commenda was an agreement between an investing partner and a traveling partner to conduct a commercial enterprise, usually overseas. The terms of the partnership varied, and are usually categorized by modern historians as unilateral commenda and bilateral commenda, based on the share of contributions and profits between the partners. The bilateral commenda was known in Venice as collegantia or colleganza. The commenda has been described as a foundational innovation in the history of finance and trade.

The commenda was a partnership between an investing partner (called the commendator, or socius stans) and a traveling partner (called the tractator or socius procertans). The investing partner would provide the capital and the traveling partner would execute a commercial enterprise (generally maritime transport), the initial capital would be returned to the investing partner and the remaining profits would then be split. The commenda was in essence as joint-stock company for the financing of a single expedition. Depending on the contribution of the traveling partner, historians define two types of commenda:

- Unilateral commenda: the investing partner would contribute the capital and a traveling partner none; the profits would be split three fourth for the investing partner and one fourth for the traveling partner. The investing partner bore all liability for loss, while the traveling partner bore none. The Statutes of Marseille of 1253 state protected the traveling partner against lawsuits following shipwreck or capture of the ship. It was called commendatio in Venice.
- Bilateral commenda, the investing partner would put up two-thirds of the capital and the traveling partner one third, and the profits would be split evenly. The investing partner bore two-thirds of any loss, while the traveling partner bore one third. It was called colleganza or collegantia in Venice and societas in Genoa.

Each individual contract was different, and sometimes the investment was a share in a ship.

== History ==
The origins of the commenda are debated, and likely derived from several sources including: the ancient Babylonian tapputûm, the Greco-Roman societas consensu contracta and foenus nauticum, the Byzantine chreokoinonia the Jewish 'isqa, and the Muslim qirad - which developed from the caravan trade of pre-Islamic Arabia. However, the Muslim qirad system is closer to the later Italian commenda, due to the travelling partner not being exposed to any risk, unlike Byzantine and Jewish systems which lack this clause. The spread of Hindu–Arabic numeral system throughout the Islamic world was intertwined with the spread of the qirad/commenda system.

Although it has precedent in these previous types of contracts, the commenda has peculiarities of its own. The first mention of the Venetian colleganza dates to 1073, but it had been used since the 10th century. By the 12th century, the commendatio had supplanted the colleganza in Venice.
