= ASEAN Exchanges =

Stock exchange collaboration in Asia

ASEAN Exchanges is a collaboration of the 7 exchanges from Malaysia, Vietnam (2 exchanges), Indonesia, Philippines, Thailand and Singapore to promote the growth of the ASEAN capital market by bringing more ASEAN investment opportunities to more investors.

The collaboration is working with partners to build greater liquidity amongst members by:

- Streamlining access to and within ASEAN
- Driving cross border harmonisation
- Creating ASEAN centric products and implementing targeted promotional initiatives
- Improving efficiency amongst member exchanges

== Market integration ==
On 18 September 2012, the ASEAN Exchanges collaboration launched the ASEAN Trading Link, a gateway for securities brokers to offer investors easier access to connected exchanges. Bursa Malaysia and Singapore Exchange were the first two exchanges to join the link on the launch day, while The Stock Exchange of Thailand joined on 15 October 2012, creating a virtual market of over 2,200 listed companies and US$1.4trillion combined market capitalisation. The purpose of the trading link is to connect the securities markets of the ASEAN exchanges, essentially making it just as easy for investors to trade in other ASEAN capital markets as it is to trade in their own domestic market.

Also on 15 October 2012, ASEAN Exchanges launched a new website, featuring aggregated ASEAN market data and analytics.

On April 8, 2011 ASEAN member countries have launched a new joint website promoting the region's blue chip equities to global investors as a commitment to integrating their stock exchanges by 2015.

== The exchanges ==
- Bursa Malaysia, formerly Kuala Lumpur Stock Exchange (KLSE), Malaysia
- HNX, Hanoi Stock Exchange, Vietnam
- HOSE, HoChiMinh Stock Exchange, Vietnam
- IDX, Indonesia Stock Exchange, previously Jakarta Stock Exchange, Indonesia
- PSE, Philippine Stock Exchange, Philippines
- SET, The Stock Exchange of Thailand, Thailand
- SGX, Singapore Exchange, Singapore

== Combined market capitalization ==
The combined market capitalisation of ASEAN Exchanges was US$2.1trillion, with over 3,600 listed companies, as at end August 2012.

== The ASEAN asset class ==
There are currently two ASEAN equity indices:

- FTSE/ASEAN Index, the regional benchmark index, representing 90-95% of the investable market capitalisation
- FTSE/ASEAN 40 Index, a tradable index consisting of the top 40 constituents from FTSE/ASEAN index, ranked by market capitalisation.

There are three Exchange Traded Funds (ETFs) that track the FTSE/ASEAN 40 Index:

- GLOBAL X FTSE ASEAN 40 ETF, listed on the New York Stock Exchange (NYSE), Bloomberg ticker ASEA:US, Reuters code ASEA.P
- CIMB FTSE ASEAN 40 MALAYSIA, listed on Bursa Malaysia, Bloomberg ticker CIMBA40 MK, Reuters code CIAM.KL
- CIMB FTSE ASEAN 40, listed on Singapore Exchange, Bloomberg ticker ASEAN SP, Reuters code CFTS.SI

In addition to the FTSE indices, the ASEAN Stars, a selection of the ASEAN Top 180 blue chip stocks representing the most exciting 30 companies of each exchange, are provided on the ASEAN Exchanges website, along with market data for each stock. The goal of the ASEAN Stars is to provide brokers and investors with an easily identifiable reference of blue chip companies on each exchange, ranked in terms of market capitalization and liquidity.

== See also ==
- List of ASEAN stock exchanges by market capitalization
