= List of countries by stock market capitalization =

The following list ranks countries by the market capitalization of all domestic companies listed in the country. Market capitalization, commonly called market cap, is the market value of a publicly traded company's outstanding shares.

The global stock market capitalization is highly concentrated in the top 10 stock exchanges and countries.

The US accounts for about half of the world’s stock market cap, having crossed the $80 trillion mark in 2026. By region, East Asia stands in second place, with more than $40 trillion in stock market capitalization; in third place is Europe, as a whole, with no more than $20 trillion in stock market capitalization as of 2026.

Data below regarding the Chinese market is accounted for by adding mainland Chinese stock market capitalizations to mainland-based companies trading their stocks in the Hong Kong markets, thus arriving at the figure below, which may differ from other sources who do not cross border count and take consideration in these fluctuations.

== Ranking ==
Country / Territory	Total market cap		Number of domestic companies	Data Year
Country / Territory	Millions of US$	% of GDP	Number of domestic companies	Data Year
United States	78,110,000	227.0	4,600	2026
China	19,490,000	98.2	5,462	2026
Japan	7,900,000	156.7	3,933	2026
India	5,560,000	127	6,202	2026
United Kingdom	4,730,000	98.6	1,900	2026
Canada	4,390,000	157.8	3,800	2026
Taiwan	4,240,000	520	381.7	2026
South Korea	3,310,000	262.6	5,949	2026
France	3,040,000	103.3	457	2026
Switzerland	2,970,000	195	250	2026
Germany	2,970,000	59.8	435	2026
Saudi Arabia	2,470,000	250	352	2026
Australia	2,120,000	102.4	2,245	2026
Netherlands	1,830,000	155	135	2026
Sweden	1,450,000	184.3	1,050	2026
Spain	1,400,000	96.0	277	2026
Brazil	1,200,000	34.7	468	2026
United Arab Emirates	1,080,000	208.5	172	2026
Hong Kong	1,030,000	224.8	2,673	2026
Italy	950,000	32.1	290	2026
Indonesia	940,000	66.4	954	2026
Belgium	870,000	106.3	117	2026
Singapore	820,000	116.5	400	2026
Denmark	633,930	156.8	178	2026
Mexico	626,830	22.5	129	2026
Russia	601,560	31.4	194	2026
Thailand	568,000	98.7	860	2026
Israel	565,000	61.2	511	2026
South Africa	551,740	291.6	220	2026
Norway	515,000	73.4	180	2026
Malaysia	508,000	106.5	1,031	2026
Finland	390,000	95.9	134	2026
Philippines	345,000	54.6	280	2026
Vietnam	310,000	51.2	393	2026
Chile	305,000	79.3	437	2026
Turkey	285,000	28.6	551	2026
Ireland	298,000	24.7	43	2026
Poland	292,000	21.6	749	2026
Qatar	288,000	79.7	52	2026
Austria	224,500	23.2	68	2026
Greece	185,660	78.4	150	2026
Iran	170,500	39.3	594	2026
Kuwait	155,475	88.3	138	2026
Colombia	144,080	40.5	60	2026
Romania	130,960	38.2	84	2026
Morocco	110,880	72.0	76	2026
Argentina	105,300	16.5	90	2026
Portugal	102,000	36.1	40	2026
New Zealand	100,500	35.7	112	2026
Nigeria	90,810	19.5	156	2026
Kazakhstan	89,170	34.8	100	2026
Peru	84,800	26.5	176	2026
Hungary	83,230	42.5	68	2026
Oman	80,080	68.5	110	2026
Bangladesh	59,204	11.608	400	2026
Egypt	67,770	16.8	215	2026
Czech Republic	42,500	10.2	63	2026
Luxembourg	41,862	50.2	28	2026
Jordan	38,140	75.0	170	2026
Cyprus	35,020	105.1	93	2026
Nepal	33,600	74.5	333	2026
Croatia	32.76	41.5	100	2026
Ivory Coast	28,980	31.4	46	2026
Pakistan	27,740	18.0	561	2026
Kenya	26,430	23.5	63	2026
Slovenia	24,930	35.2	26	2026
Ghana	22,060	28.5	42	2026
Iceland	21,480	70.0	34	2026
Bahrain	20,188	45.0	40	2026
Sri Lanka	19,689	22.5	284	2026
Lebanon	18,950	35.0	10	2026
Uzbekistan	18,744	18.0	100	2026
Panama	18,288	21.2	90	2026
Malawi	14,910	110.5	16	2026
Jamaica	12,830	29.1	101	2026
Tunisia	11,600	22.4	82	2026
Ecuador	11,360	9.2	50	2026
Zambia	7,765	27.7	25	2026
Tanzania	7,320	8.7	28	2026
Lithuania	6,930	8.3	45	2026
Mauritius	6,450	38.2	170	2026
North Macedonia	6,111	38.4	30	2026
Belarus	6,011	7.7	50	2026
Estonia	5,745	12.8	19	2026
Algeria	5,130	2.3	6	2026
Botswana	4,707	22.5	31	2026
Rwanda	4,600	30.0	10	2026
Bulgaria	4,550	4.2	300	2026
Bosnia and Herzegovina	4,530	15.1	400	2026
Ukraine	4,420	2.5	78	2026
Malta	4,288	19.5	34	2026
Serbia	4,208	5.1	10	2026
Palestine	4,019	18.6	49	2026
Montenegro	3,919	51.2	112	2026
Mongolia	3,850	18.5	178	2026
Papua New Guinea	3,520	10.5	14	2026
Mozambique	3,396	12.8	16	2026
Costa Rica	2,910	3.2	52	2026
Slovakia	2,654	2.1	62	2026
Kyrgyzstan	2,517	21.5	20	2026
Barbados	2,387	42.1	19	2026
Syria	2,158	15.0	27	2026
Azerbaijan	1,920	2.5	36	2026
Namibia	1,820	13.5	34	2026
Bermuda	1,450	18.2	45	2026
Armenia	1,270	5.2	12	2026
Seychelles	1,213	62.0	41	2026
Cayman Islands	850	14.0	200	2026
Latvia	496	1.2	20	2026
Myanmar	315	0.5	8	2026
Sudan	210	0.8	54	2026
Georgia	179	0.6	29	2026
Laos	92	0.6	11	2026

== Historical development of world market cap ==
Year	World market cap		Number of listed companies
Year	Millions of US$	% of GDP	Number of listed companies
1975	1,149,245	27.2	14,577
1980	2,525,736	29.6	17,273
1985	4,684,978	47.0	20,555
1990	9,519,107	50.8	23,732
1991	11,340,785	56.8	24,666
1992	10,819,256	50.2	24,947
1993	13,897,390	61.7	28,300
1994	14,639,924	60.9	30,290
1995	17,263,728	64.0	33,379
1996	19,806,691	72.3	35,617
1997	22,029,761	80.7	36,946
1998	24,555,201	89.6	37,928
1999	33,181,159	115.1	38,414
2000	30,925,434	101.1	39,892
2001	26,792,162	88.4	40,157
2002	22,802,792	72.7	38,894
2003	31,107,425	84.9	41,051
2004	36,540,980	89.2	38,724
2005	40,512,446	92.6	39,096
2006	50,074,966	106.1	43,104
2007	60,456,082	114.0	44,034
2008	32,418,516	56.2	43,949
2009	47,471,293	83.8	42,669
2010	54,259,518	87.3	43,427
2011	47,521,341	68.8	44,323
2012	54,503,237	78.4	43,772
2013	64,367,842	89.0	44,853
2014	67,177,254	90.3	45,743
2015	62,268,184	94.5	43,983
2016	65,117,714	97.1	43,806
2017	79,501,948	111.1	43,440
2018	68,893,044	91.9	45,050
2019	78,825,583	108.4	49,921
2020	93,686,226	133.4	49,839
2021	111,159,259	131.8	51,337
2022	93,688,922	106.2	47,926
2023	101,497,716	94.9	53,298
2024	120,809,774	107.8	53,601
2025	136,287,177	116.3	60,392

== See also ==
- List of public corporations by market capitalization
- List of ASEAN stock exchanges by market capitalization
- List of major stock exchanges
- Buffett indicator
- FTSE Global Equity Index Series, covering 17,000 stocks in 48 countries
