= Qirad =

Islamic partnership

The qirad (also known as Muqaradah by Hanafi and Hanbali scholars) was one of the basic financial instruments of the medieval Islamic world. It was an arrangement between one or more investors and an agent where the investors entrusted capital to an agent who then traded with it in hopes of making profit. Both parties then received a previously settled portion of the profit. The agent was not liable for any losses, provided these did not exceed the capital subscribed. (In later Hanafi jurisprudence, the agent had no authority to incur liabilities in excess of the capital, and so would have to bear any further losses personally.)

In modern Islamic finance, the term "Mudarabah" is used for the same instrument. "Mudarabah" is derived from "al-darb al-ard", which is mentioned in the Quran, however "Mudarabah" as a term technically has no explicit basis in the Quran and Sunnah.

== Origins and history ==
Although the qirad is never mentioned in the Qur'an, many Islamic traditions attribute its origin to the Prophet Muhammad and his companions. These traditions describe Muhammad and his companions either using the qirad or endorsing the institution. Many will notice that the qirad is almost identical to the institution of the commenda later used in western Europe, though whether the qirad transformed into the commenda, or the two institutions evolved independently cannot be stated with certainty.

== Legal technicalities ==
Though there existed several different major schools of Islamic law, the basic legalities of the qirad were rather uniform throughout the schools.

Dinars and dirhams, as well as gold, silver, and copper coins in circulation were allowed to be invested. However, goods such as barley were restricted from the qirad because the possible fluctuations in their value in the markets. In the Mongol Empire, the contractual features of a Mongol-ortoq partnership closely resembled that of qirad arrangements, however, Mongol investors were not constrained using uncoined precious metals and tradable goods for partnership investments.

The agent was allowed to take the investment and split up his investments in any way, as well as invest in anything he wanted, except in cases where stocks are plentiful and not seasonally bound. It was also permissible for an investor to forbid the agent from buying certain kinds of goods. Many of the third parties involved in the qirad were actually unaware of their involvement which allowed the agent to trade freely and without liability.

Although the fractional split in profit was agreed on beforehand, the investor could not stipulate a specific sum of the money from the profit, or that a certain profit be made. In this way, the qirad remained a complete risk on the investor and did not infringe on the free market economy., It was however possible to make a deal on the split of the profit beforehand by stipulating a specific percentage. This could be either a low or a high percentage.

The principal investment can not be paid back, either by the investor ending the agreement, or the agent ending the agreement, if the principal is still invested in goods. The goods must be sold before the principal can be handed back, and the profits split. On the other hand, the investor is allowed to buy goods from the agent if he does not connect any conditions to this transaction.

The agent can also ask the help of a servant of the investor, but this servant also has to share in the profit and can not be asked to do any other work than work connected to the investment. A servant can also invest in the same investment as his master and also shares in the profit.

If the agent has to hire help for a job, the wage for this person can be paid from the principal, except if the wage should result in loss for the investor, the agent himself is responsible for whatever is not covered by the principal.

The agent can use the principal for food and clothes if he should travel for his business, and the principal is large enough to allow it. If he stays at home this is not allowed.

An agent can invest the money of an investor, the agent then becomes an investor himself, but he is then liable for the losses of the second agent. If the principal decreases, the original investor is allowed to ask the original agent to cover the loss.
