= List of major stock exchanges =

This is a list of major stock exchanges. Future exchanges that also offer trading in securities besides trading in futures contracts may be listed both here and in the list of futures exchanges.

There are twenty one stock exchanges in the world that have a market capitalization of over US$1 trillion each. They are sometimes referred to as the "$1 Trillion Club". These exchanges accounted for 87% of global market capitalization in 2016. Some exchanges do include companies from outside the country where the exchange is located.

== Major stock exchanges ==
Major stock exchange groups of issued shares of listed companies with over USD 1 trillion market capitalization as of September 2026.

Stock exchange	MIC	Region	City	Market cap (USD tn)	Time zone	Δ	DST	Open hours (local time)			UTC (without DST)	
Stock exchange	MIC	Region	City	Market cap (USD tn)	Time zone	Δ	DST	Open	Close	Lunch	Open	Close
Nasdaq	XNAS	United States	New York City	36.0	EST/EDT	−5:00	Mar–Nov	09:30	16:00	No	14:30	21:00
New York Stock Exchange	XNYS	United States	New York City	31.0	EST/EDT	−5:00	Mar–Nov	09:30	16:00	No	14:30	21:00
Shanghai Stock Exchange	XSHG	China	Shanghai	10.21	CST	+8:00		09:30	15:00	11:30–13:00	01:30	07:00
Euronext	XAMS; ASEX; XBRU; XMSM; XLIS; XMIL; XOSL; XPAR	Europe	Amsterdam; Athens; Brussels; Dublin; Lisbon; Milan; Oslo; Paris	8.136	CET/CEST	+1:00	Mar–Oct	09:00	17:30	No	08:00	16:30
Japan Exchange Group (Tokyo Stock Exchange)	XJPX (TYO)	Japan	Tokyo	7.95	JST	+9:00	no	09:00	15:00	11:30–12:30	00:00	06:00
Shenzhen Stock Exchange	XSHE	China	Shenzhen	7.3	CST	+8:00		09:30	15:00	11:30–13:00	01:30	07:00
Hong Kong Stock Exchange	XHKG	Hong Kong	Hong Kong	6.2	HKT	+8:00		09:30	16:00	12:00-13:00	01:30	08:00
Bombay Stock Exchange	XBOM	India	Mumbai	5.44	IST	+5:30		09:15	15:30	No	03:45	10:00
National Stock Exchange	XNSE	India	Mumbai	5.36	IST	+5:30		09:15	15:30	No	03:45	10:00
Taiwan Stock Exchange	XTAI	Taiwan	Taipei	4.97	NST (Taiwan)	+8:00		09:00	13:30	No	01:00	05:30
Korea Exchange	XKOS	South Korea	Seoul; Busan	4.014	KST	+9:00		09:00	15:30	No	00:00	06:30
Toronto Stock Exchange	XTSE	Canada	Toronto	4.53	EST/EDT	−5:00	Mar–Nov	09:30	16:00	No	14:30	21:00
London Stock Exchange	XLON	United Kingdom	London	3.94	GMT/BST	+0:00	Mar–Oct	08:00	16:30	No	08:00	16:30
German Stock Exchange (Deutsche Börse AG)	XFRA	Germany	Frankfurt	3.06	CET/CEST	+1:00	Mar–Oct	9:00	17:30	No	8:00	16:30
Saudi Exchange	XSAU	Saudi Arabia	Riyadh	2.63	AST	+3:00		10:00	15:00	No	07:00	12:00
Australian Securities Exchange	XASX	Australia	Sydney	1.97	AEST/AEDT	+10:00	Oct–Apr	10:00	16:00	No	00:00	06:00
SIX Swiss Exchange	XSWX	Switzerland	Zürich	1.79	CET/CEST	+1:00	Mar–Oct	09:00	17:30	No	07:00	15:30
Nasdaq Nordic and Baltic Exchanges	XCSE; XSTO; XHEL; XTAL; XRIS; XLIT; XICE	Europe	Copenhagen; Stockholm; Helsinki; Tallinn; Riga; Vilnius; Reykjavík	1.79	EET/EEST	+2:00	Mar–Oct	10:00	?	18:30	08:00	16:30
Johannesburg Stock Exchange	XJSE	South Africa	Johannesburg	1.53	SAST	+2:00		09:00	16:50	No	07:00	14:50
B3 (stock exchange)	BVMF	Brazil	São Paulo	1.10	BRT	−3:00		10:00	18:30	No	13:00	21:30
Tel Aviv Stock Exchange	XTAE	Israel	Tel Aviv	1.01	IST	+2:00	Mar–Oct	09:59	17:14	No	07:59	15:14

Notes

* "Δ" to UTC, as well as "Open (UTC)" and "Close (UTC)" columns contain valid data only for standard time in a given time zone. During daylight saving time period, the UTC times will be one hour less and Δs one hour more.

** Applicable for non-closing auction session shares only.

The 10 largest stock exchanges (New York City and Mumbai have two exchanges).

== See also ==
- List of African stock exchanges
- List of stock exchanges in the Americas
- List of Asian stock exchanges
- List of European stock exchanges
- List of stock exchanges in Oceania
- List of countries by stock market capitalization
- List of countries without a stock exchange
- List of futures exchanges
- World Federation of Exchanges
- Federation of Euro-Asian Stock Exchanges
