= Societates publicanorum =

Private tax-farming and contracting companies in the Roman Republic

The Societates publicanorum were large-scale private companies in the Roman Republic that played a significant role in state finances by contracting with the government to collect taxes, manage public works, and supply the Roman army.
