= List of Asian stock exchanges =

Asia

This is a list of Asian stock exchanges.

In the Asian region, there are multiple stock exchanges. As of 2025, the top 10 major stock exchanges in Asia as per market capitalisation are listed below.

- Shanghai Stock Exchange, China
- Tokyo Stock Exchange, Japan
- National Stock Exchange, India
- Bombay Stock Exchange, India
- Hong Kong Stock Exchange, China
- Shenzhen Stock Exchange, China
- Saudi Exchange, Saudi Arabia
- Taiwan Stock Exchange, Taiwan
- Tehran Stock Exchange, Iran
- Korea Exchange, South Korea

== Asian stock exchanges UN subregion ==
List of Asian stock exchanges by UN subregion.

=== Central Asia ===
Economy	Exchange	Location	Founded	Listings	Link	Technology	Operating MIC
Kazakhstan	Kazakhstan Stock Exchange	Almaty	1993	127	KASE		
Kazakhstan	Astana International Exchange	Astana	2018	25	AIX	Nasdaq Matching Engine	AIXK
Kyrgyzstan	Kyrgyz Stock Exchange (KSE)	Bishkek	1994		KSE		
Kyrgyzstan	Stock Exchange of Kyrgyzstan (BTS)	Bishkek	1999		BTS		
Tajikistan	Central Asian Stock Exchange	Dushanbe	2015		CASE		
Turkmenistan	State Commodity and Raw Material Exchange of Turkmenistan	Ashgabat	1994		SRCMET		
Uzbekistan	Tashkent Stock Exchange	Tashkent	1994	104	UZSE		

=== Eastern Asia ===
Economy	Exchange	Location	Founded	Listings	Link
China	Beijing Stock Exchange	Beijing	2021	88 (March 2022)	BSE
China	Dalian Commodity Exchange	Dalian	1993		DCE
China	China Financial Futures Exchange	Shanghai	2006		CFFEX
China	Shanghai Futures Exchange	Shanghai	1999		SHFE
China	Shanghai Metal Exchange	Shanghai	1992		SHME
China	Shanghai Stock Exchange	Shanghai	1990	2,061 (March 2022)	SSE
China	Shenzhen Stock Exchange	Shenzhen	1991	2,607 (March 2022)	SZSE
China	Zhengzhou Commodity Exchange	Zhengzhou	1990		ZCE
Hong Kong	Hong Kong Stock Exchange	Hong Kong	1891	2,538 (2020)	SEHK
Hong Kong	Hong Kong Exchanges and Clearing	Hong Kong	2000	aka Hang Seng	HKEx
Japan	Tokyo Stock Exchange	Tokyo	1878	1,838 (Prime Market) + 1,452 (Standard Market) + 484 (Growth Market) + 56 (Tokyo Pro Market) as of July 31, 2022	JPX
Japan	JASDAQ	Tokyo	1963	All 658 companies in the Standard subsection were transitioned into the Standard Market and all 36 companies in the Growth subsection were transitioned into the Growth Market.	JPX
Japan	JASDAQ NEO	Tokyo	2007	merged into JASDAQ in Oct. 2010	
Japan	Mothers	Tokyo	1999	All 424 companies were transitioned into the Growth Market.	JPX
Japan	Tokyo Pro Market (formerly Tokyo AIM)	Tokyo	2009	56 as of July 31, 2022	JPX
Japan	Osaka Exchange (formerly Osaka Securities Exchange)	Osaka	1878	The cash equity market of Osaka Securities Exchange was integrated into Tokyo Stock Exchange on Jul. 16, 2013.	JPX
Japan	Hercules (formerly Nasdaq Japan)	Osaka	2000	merged into JASDAQ in Oct. 2010	(OSE) Hercules
Japan	Nagoya Stock Exchange	Nagoya	1886	182 (First Section) + 80 (Second Section) as of Feb. 18, 2022	NSE
Japan	Centrex	Nagoya	1999	14 as of Feb. 18, 2022	Centrex
Japan	Fukuoka Stock Exchange	Fukuoka	1949		FSE(in Japanese)
Japan	Q-Board	Fukuoka	2000		QB(in Japanese)
Japan	Sapporo Securities Exchange	Sapporo	1949		SSE(in Japanese)
Japan	Ambitious	Sapporo	2000		AMB(in Japanese)
Macau	Macao Financial Asset Exchange	Macau	2018		MOX
Mongolia	Mongolian Stock Exchange	Ulaanbaatar	1991		MSE
Mongolia	Ulaanbaatar Securities Exchange	Ulaanbaatar	2016		
Mongolia	Mongolian Commodity Exchange	Ulaanbaatar	2013	There are 21 types of raw materials of 6 group commodities traded on the market: "Cashmere, Wool, Livestock, Grain, Meat, Leather"	MCE(in English)
South Korea	Chosun Stock Exchange (formerly Chosun Exchange (1932))	Seoul	1943	Closed down by USAMGIK	
South Korea	Korea Exchange	Busan	2005	2,354 (2020)	KRX
South Korea	Korea Stock Exchange	Seoul	1956	Merged into Korea Exchange through KSE, KOSDAQ, KOFEX 1/27/2005	
South Korea	KOSDAQ	Seoul	1996	1411	KOSDAQ
Taiwan	Taiwan Stock Exchange	Taipei	1961	898 (2020)	TWSE
Taiwan	Taipei Exchange	Taipei	1994		TPEx
Taiwan	Taiwan Futures Exchange	Taipei	1998		TAIFEX

=== Northern Asia ===
Economy	Exchange	Location	Founded	Listings	Link	Technology	Operating MIC
Russia	Moscow Exchange (MOEX)	Moscow	2011 Merge (1992 & 1995 before)	219	MOEX		

=== Southeast Asia ===
Economy	Exchange	Location	Founded	Listings	Link
ASEAN	ASEAN Exchanges		2012		
Cambodia	Cambodia Securities Exchange	Phnom Penh	2011		CSX
Indonesia	Indonesia Stock Exchange	Jakarta	1912	833 (2023)	IDX
Indonesia	Jakarta Futures Exchange	Jakarta	1999		JFX
Indonesia	Indonesia Commodity and Derivatives Exchange	Jakarta	2009		ICDX
Laos	Lao Securities Exchange	Vientiane	2011	11 (2021)	LSX
Malaysia	Bursa Malaysia	Kuala Lumpur	1964	801	MYX
Malaysia	Malaysia Derivatives Exchange	Kuala Lumpur	1980		
Malaysia	MESDAQ	Kuala Lumpur	1997		
Malaysia	FUSANG Exchange	Labuan	2015		FSC
Myanmar	Myanmar Securities Exchange Centre	Yangon	1996		MSEC
Myanmar	Yangon Stock Exchange	Yangon	2015		YSX
Philippines	Philippine Dealing Exchange	Metro Manila	2005		PDEx
Philippines	Philippine Stock Exchange	Metro Manila	1927	329 (2020)	PSE
Philippines	Manila Commodity Exchange	Metro Manila	2011		MCX
Singapore	Singapore Exchange	Singapore	1999	776	SGX
Thailand	Stock Exchange of Thailand	Bangkok	1975	614 (2023)	SET
Thailand	Market for Alternative Investment	Bangkok	1999	205 (2023)	MAI
Thailand	Bond Electronic Exchange	Bangkok	2003		BEX
Thailand	AFET	Bangkok	2004		AFEX
Thailand	Thailand Futures Exchange	Bangkok	2005		TFEX
Vietnam	Vietnam Stock Exchange	Hanoi	2021		VNX
Vietnam	Ho Chi Minh Stock Exchange	Ho Chi Minh City	2000	396 (2018)	HSX
Vietnam	Hanoi Stock Exchange	Hanoi	2005		HNX

=== Southern Asia ===
Economy	Exchange	Location	Founded	Listings	Link	Technology
Bangladesh	Chittagong Stock Exchange	Chittagong	1995	293(2020)	CSE	
Bangladesh	Dhaka Stock Exchange	Dhaka	1954	750	DSE	Nasdaq X-stream INET
Bhutan	Royal Securities Exchange of Bhutan	Thimphu	1993	20	RSEBL	
India	Bombay Stock Exchange	Mumbai	1875	5,300	BSE	
India	India International Exchange	GIFT City, Ahmedabad	2017		INX	
India	Indian Commodity Exchange	Navi Mumbai	2017		ICEX	
India	Multi Commodity Exchange	Mumbai	2008		MCX	
India	National Commodity and Derivatives Exchange	Mumbai	2003		NCDEX	
India	National Stock Exchange of India	Mumbai	1992	2,100+	NSE	
Iran	Tehran Stock Exchange	Tehran	1967	666 (2020)	TSE	
Iran	Iran Fara Bourse	Tehran	2008	547 (2020)	IFB	
Iran	Iran Mercantile Exchange	Tehran	2006		IME	
Iran	Iranian Energy Exchange	Tehran	2008		IRENEX	
Maldives	Maldives Stock Exchange	Malé	2002	10	MSE	
Nepal	Nepal Stock Exchange	Kathmandu	1993	333	NEPSE	
Pakistan	Pakistan Stock Exchange	Karachi	2016	540	PSX	
Sri Lanka	Colombo Stock Exchange	Colombo	1896	290	CSE	

=== Western Asia ===
Economy	Exchange	Location	Founded	Listings	Link	Technology	Operating MIC
Armenia	Armenian Stock Exchange	Yerevan	2001		NASDAQ OMX Armenia		
Azerbaijan	Baku Stock Exchange	Baku	2000		BFB		
Bahrain	Bahrain Stock Exchange	Manama	1987		BSE	Nasdaq X-stream	
Cyprus	Cyprus Stock Exchange	Nicosia	1996		CSE		
Georgia	Georgian Stock Exchange	Tbilisi	1999		SSB		
Iraq	Iraq Stock Exchange	Baghdad	2004		ISX	Nasdaq	
Israel	Tel Aviv Stock Exchange	Tel Aviv	1953	473	TASE		
Jordan	Amman Stock Exchange	Amman	1999		ASE		
Kuwait	Boursa Kuwait	Safat	1977		BK	Nasdaq X-stream	
Lebanon	Beirut Stock Exchange	Beirut	1920		BSE		
Oman	Muscat Securities Market	Muscat	1988		MSM		
Palestine	Palestine Securities Exchange	Nablus	1995		PSE	Nasdaq	
Qatar	Doha Securities Market	Doha	1997		DSM	NYSE Euronext Universal Trading Platform	
Saudi Arabia	Tadawul	Riyadh	2007	202	Tadawul	Nasdaq X-stream INET	
Syria	Damascus Securities Exchange	Damascus	2009	24	DSE		
Turkey	Borsa Istanbul	Istanbul	1866		ISE		
United Arab Emirates	Abu Dhabi Securities Exchange	Abu Dhabi	2000	73	ADX		
United Arab Emirates	Dubai Financial Market	Dubai	2000	178	DFM	Nasdaq Matching Engine	
United Arab Emirates	NASDAQ Dubai	Dubai	2005		NASDAQ Dubai		
United Arab Emirates	Dubai Gold & Commodities Exchange	Dubai	2005		DGCX	Cinnober TRADExpress	

== See also ==
- List of ASEAN stock exchanges by market capitalization
- Federation of Euro-Asian Stock Exchanges
- List of stock exchanges
