= Sech =

Sech may refer to:

- Hyperbolic secant, usually abbreviated as sech
- Sich or sech, an administrative and military centre for Zaporozhian Cossacks
- Sech, Sultanpur Lodhi, a village in Punjab, India
- Sech (singer), Panamanian singer

== See also ==
- Seč (disambiguation)
- Seich (disambiguation)
- Setch (disambiguation)
- Sich (disambiguation)
