= Myanmar Securities Exchange Centre =

Stock Exchange

Myanmar Securities Exchange Centre Co., Ltd.
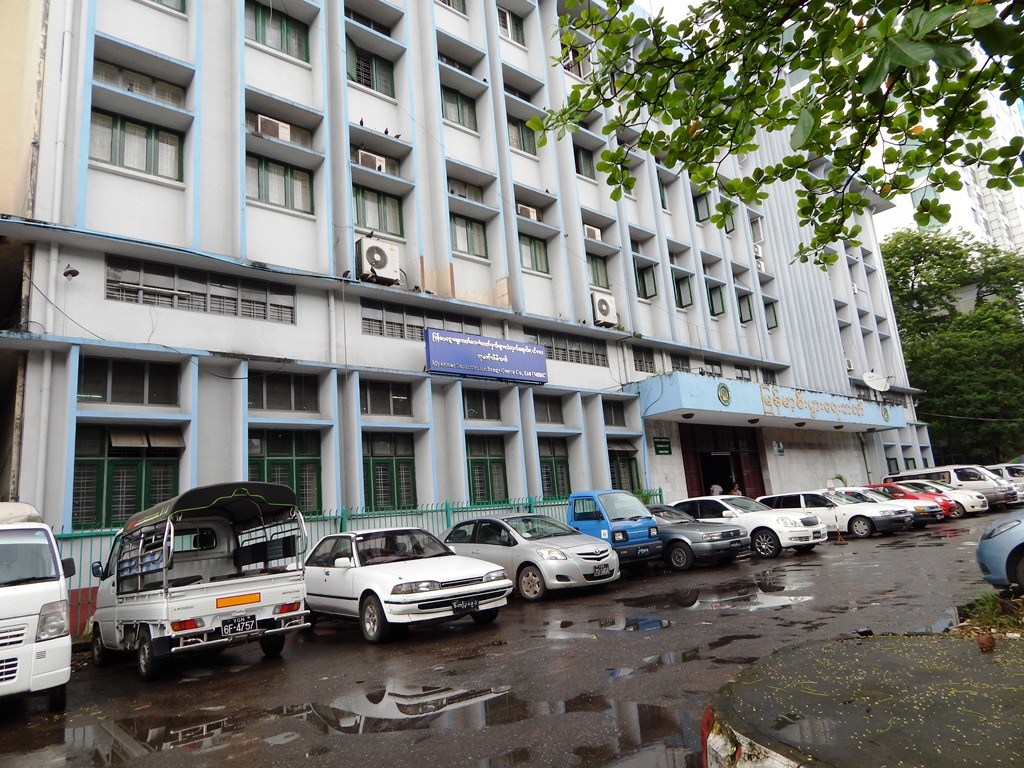
- Type: Stock exchange
- Location: 21–25 Sule Pagoda Road, Kyauktada, Yangon, Myanmar
- Founded: June 1996
- Owner: Myanma Economic Bank and Daiwa Securities
- Key people: Soe Thane ( Resigned )
- Currency: Myanma kyat
- No. of listings: 6
- Website: www.msecmyanmar.com

The Myanmar Securities Exchange Centre (MSEC), located in Yangon, Myanmar, is one of the two stock exchanges in the country. The exchange, a 50-50 joint venture between the state-owned Myanma Economic Bank and the Daiwa Securities Group, currently lists only two securities, both of which are rarely traded. The over-the-counter (OTC) market remains open despite the Yangon Stock Exchange's arrival in 2015.

== History ==
The MSEC is the country's second stock exchange after the Rangoon Stock Exchange, which traded shares of a few British and American stocks in the 1930s. The fledgling exchange, operated by seven European firms, was a secondary OTC market with most of the quotes sourced from Calcutta and Bombay exchanges. It closed down at the outbreak of World War II. The RSE was revived in the late 1950s to trade shares of nine public-private joint-venture corporations. But this OTC market too died in the 1960s when all the firms were nationalized by the military government that seized power in 1962.

Another military government came to power in 1988, and it allowed the state-owned Myanma Economic Bank to form a 50-50 joint-venture with Daiwa Securities in April 1996. The Myanmar Securities Exchange Centre was formed with an authorized capital of 17 million USD and paid-up capital of 3.4 million USD in June 1996. It listed two public-private joint-venture firms: Forest Products Joint Venture Corporation and Myanmar Citizens Bank. The exchange began its trading operations in December 1996.

== Current status ==
Currently, the Myanmar exchange is dormant considering that no new companies are listing in the bourse. Instead, the government plans to set up another bourse. No new companies have signed up beyond the first two, and there is little trading. A 2011 Reuters report states that the exchange had no trading floor, and had eight employees who handled over-the-counter transactions and manually updated share prices, using a whiteboard, a marker pen and a stencil whenever a customer dropped by. Indeed, most people do not even know that the market exists at all. State-owned and private enterprises alike have chosen not to list. Their reasons include the firm's fear of tax liability, fear of loss of control and unfamiliarity with the corporate culture.

== Bibliography ==
- Aung Hla Tun (2011-09-21). "Myanmar's forgotten bourse eyes long-awaited expansion". Reuters.
- Roughneen, Simon (2013-05-29). "Burma's 'Vital' Stock Exchange Plans Proceeding on Schedule". The Irrawaddy.
- Sanda Win (2011-08-29). "Forgotten securities market eyeing revival". The Myanmar Times. Archived from the original on 2012-11-04.
- Song, Sophie (2013-07-17). "Myanmar Stock Exchange To Launch After Security Exchange Law Passed". International Business Times.
- Takako Taniguchi and Kyaw Thu (2013-09-03). "Myanmar's 2015 Stock Exchange Deadline at Risk: Southeast Asia". Bloomberg.
- Wong, May (2013-07-16). "Myanmar aims to set up its first stock exchange by 2013".
- Yin Yin Mya (2000). Myat Thein, Maw Than (ed.). Financial Resources for Development in Myanmar: Lessons from Asia (illustrated ed.). Institute of Southeast Asian Studies. ISBN 9789812300706.
