= Seč =

Seč may refer to places:

== Czech Republic ==
- Seč (Chrudim District), a town in the Pardubice Region
  - Seč Reservoir next to the town
- Seč (Plzeň-South District), a municipality and village in the Plzeň Region
- Seč (Ústí nad Orlicí District), a municipality and village in the Pardubice Region
- Seč, a village and part of Lipová (Prostějov District) in the Olomouc Region
- Vidlatá Seč, a municipality and village in the Pardubice Region

== Slovakia ==
- Seč, Prievidza District, a municipality and village in the Trenčín Region
- Rimavská Seč, a municipality and village in the Banská Bystrica Region

== Slovenia ==
- Seč, Kočevje, an abandoned settlement in the Municipality of Kočevje
- Seč, Novo Mesto, an abandoned settlement in the Municipality of Novo Mesto

== See also ==
Sec (disambiguation)
