= SEC =

SEC, sec, or Sec may refer to:

== Government ==
- Securities and Exchange Commission (disambiguation)
  - United States Securities and Exchange Commission
- State-owned Enterprises Commission, Taiwan
- State Examinations Commission, Ireland
- State Electricity Commission of Victoria, Australia

== Sports ==
- Southeastern Conference, a collegiate athletics conference operating primarily in the southeastern United States
- Southeast Conference (Wisconsin), a high school athletic conference in southeastern Wisconsin, U.S.
- Speedway European Championship, an annual individual speedway event

== Science ==
- Saga execution coordinator, a component of the saga interaction pattern in computer science
- Sec, a secretion system in bacteria
- Secant function, in mathematics
- Size-exclusion chromatography
- Space Weather Prediction Center, formerly Space Environment Center
- Selenocysteine, an amino acid
- Secondary Electron Conduction Tube, a part of the Apollo TV camera
- SEC experiment, or Scattering Experiment Chambers, at CERN

== Companies ==
- Samsung Electronics Co., Ltd., an electronics company
- Solar Entertainment Corporation, a Filipino media company

== Places ==
- Seč (disambiguation), in Central Europe

== Other uses ==
- Dalek Sec, a Doctor Who character
- Scottish Episcopal Church
- Sec (wine), a French term used to indicate the sweetness level of a wine
- SEC Armadillo, an auditorium in the Scottish Event Campus, Glasgow
- SEC Centre, an exhibition centre in the Scottish Event Campus, Glasgow
- Secco, a musical term meaning "dry", "without resonance" or "quick"
- Second, abbreviated sec, a unit of time
- Section (typography), a subdivision of a chapter
- St Edmund's College, Ipswich
- Mercedes-Benz SEC
- Secondary Education Certificate, a part of the education system in Malta
- Sechelt language (ISO 639-3 code: sec)

== See also ==
- Sxc (disambiguation)
- Section (disambiguation)
