= Sta. Lucia Land =

Real estate development company based in the Philippines

- Logo
- Type: Public (PSE: SLI)
- Founded: 1966 (Note: 1966 as Zipporah Mining and Industrial Corporation 1995 as Zipporah Realty Holdings, Inc. 2007 as Sta. Lucia Land, Inc.)
- Headquarters: Penthouse Building III, Sta. Lucia Mall, Cainta, Rizal, Philippines
- Key people: Vicente Santos (Chairman); Exequiel Robles (President)
- Revenue: ▲ ₱11.315 Billion (2023)
- Net income: ▲ ₱3.733 Billion (2023)
- Total assets: ▲ ₱61.899 Billion (2023)
- Parent: Sta. Lucia Realty and Development, Inc.
- Subsidiaries: Sta. Lucia Homes; Soto Grande Hotels; SantaLucia Ventures
- Website: www.stalucialand.com.ph

Sta. Lucia Land, Inc. (PSE: SLI) is a real estate development company based in the Philippines. The firm serves as the real estate arm of the conglomerate, Sta. Lucia Group

== History ==
The company was incorporated on December 6, 1966 under the name Zipporah Mining and Industrial Corporation to engage in mining. The company became listed in the Philippine Stock Exchange on September 14, 1987. The company's primary business was changed to real estate development and the corporate name was changed to Zipporah Realty Holdings, Inc. on August 14, 1996. In 2007, Sta. Lucia Realty and Development Corporation acquired majority control of the company. The corporate name was changed to Sta. Lucia Land, Inc. (SLLI) on July 16, 2007. As a result, SLLI became a public company via reverse merger.

On December 22, 2015, SLLI became listed in the Philippine Dealing Exchange Corp. ("PDEx"). SLLI joined the PDEx community of listed corporations, with its listing of P3 Billion worth of fixed-rate Peso bonds with an over-subscription option of up to P2 Billion in the PDEx platform. This marks the maiden listing of SLI in the Philippine Bond Market. The Bonds have been rated AA+ by the Credit Rating and Investor Services Philippines, Inc.

== Developments ==
As of 2022, the Sta. Lucia Group has over 300 real estate projects in the Philippines. Sta. Lucia has developed residential developments in various places in the Philippines including Bulacan, Cavite, Laguna, Palawan, Pampanga, Pangasinan, Nueva Ecija in Luzon; Cebu, Iloilo, and Bacolod in the Visayas and in Davao in Mindanao. Among Sta. Lucia's projects include residential subdivisions and condominiums, hotels, golf courses, and shopping centers.

== Sports ==
Sta. Lucia has organized professional basketball and volleyball names under its brand. It had a team in the Philippine Basketball Association which played under the name Sta. Lucia Realtors until 2010 when the company sold its franchise to Meralco. It has also played in the Pilipinas Commercial Basketball League and the Philippine Basketball League. Sta. Lucia also sponsored the Pasig Pirates, which was renamed as the Pasig Sta. Lucia Realtors, of the Maharlika Pilipinas Basketball League.

It also previously maintained a women's volleyball team, the Sta. Lucia Lady Realtors which played in the Philippine Super Liga and competes in the Premier Volleyball League.
