= Setch =

Setch may refer to:

- Setch or Setchey, a village now part of West Winch in King's Lynn and West Norfolk
- Setch., taxonomic author abbreviation for William Albert Setchell (1864–1943), American botanist
- Terry Setch (born 1936), British painter

== See also ==
- Setsch, the German name of Seč, Kočevje, an abandoned settlement in Slovenia
- Sech (disambiguation)
