= Tokyo Pro Market =

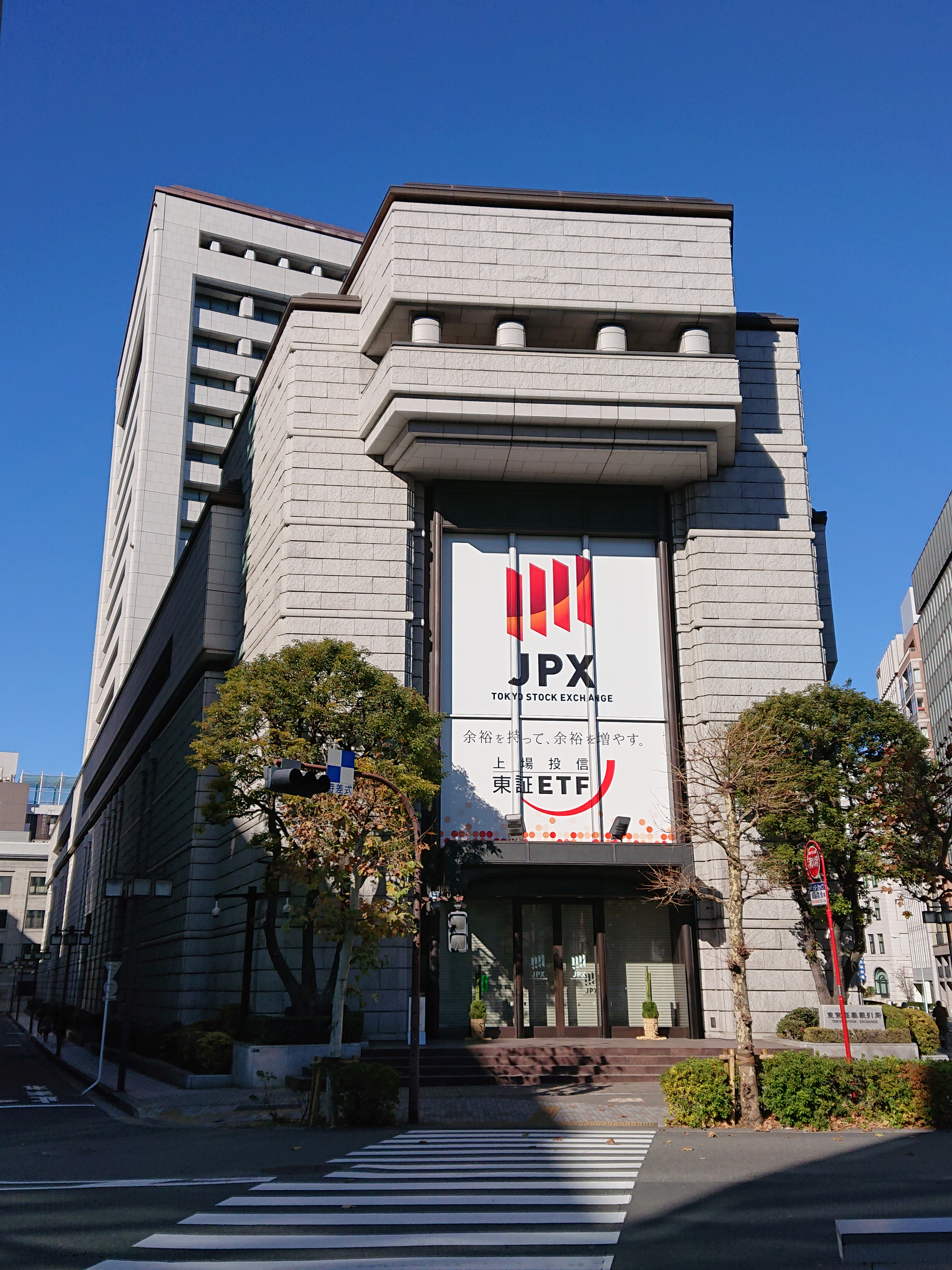
The main building of the Tokyo Stock Exchange

The Tokyo Pro Market is one of the Tokyo Stock Exchange's sections or markets, intended for alternative investment. It is the only "Specified Exchange Financial Product Market" (Japanese: 特定取引所金融商品市場) in Japan, and is so-called as it is to be a "market for professional investors". There are two markets: the Tokyo Pro Market, a stock market, and the Tokyo Pro-Bond Market, a bond market.

It was originally established on June 1, 2009, as the Tokyo AIM, jointly funded by the Tokyo Stock Exchange and the London Stock Exchange (LSE), which had operated the Alternative Investment Market (AIM), allowing for more flexible investment.

The joint venture of TSE and LSE was dissolved in March 2012, making it a wholly owned subsidiary of the Tokyo Stock Exchange. In July 2012, it became a section or market inside the Tokyo Stock Exchange, like its First and Second Sections, and Mothers, and was renamed to the Tokyo Pro Market.

== See also ==
- Alternative investment
- Alternative Investment Market of the London Stock Exchange
- Mothers (Tokyo Stock Exchange)
