= Securities and Exchange Commission (disambiguation) =

Securities and Exchange Commission may refer to:

- United States Securities and Exchange Commission
- Australian Securities and Investments Commission
- Bangladesh Securities and Exchange Commission
- China Securities Regulatory Commission
- Commission de Surveillance du Secteur Financier
- Cyprus Securities and Exchange Commission
- European Securities and Markets Authority
- Federal Commission of Securities Market of Russia
- Iraq Securities Commission
- Polish Securities and Exchange Commission
- Portuguese Securities Market Commission
- Republika Srpska Securities Commission
- Securities Commission (Brazil)
- Securities Commission Malaysia
- Securities and Exchange Commission (Nigeria)
- Securities and Exchange Commission (Philippines)
- Securities and Exchange Commission of Myanmar
- Securities and Exchange Commission of Pakistan
- Securities and Exchange Commission of Thailand
- Securities and Exchange Surveillance Commission
- Securities and Futures Commission
- Trinidad and Tobago Securities and Exchange Commission
