= Seiche (disambiguation) =

Seich may refer to:

- Seich, a commune in the Hautes-Pyrénées department of France

Seiche may refer to:

- Seiche, a standing wave in a body of water
- Seiche (river), a river in Brittany, France, which is a tributary of the Vilaine
- seiche, a French term for a cuttlefish or bobtail squid.

Seiches may refer to:

- Seiches-sur-le-Loir, a commune in the Maine-et-Loire department of France.

Seyches is a commune in the Lot-et-Garonne department of France.

Seitsch is the German name of Siciny, a village in Poland.

Siech may refer to:

- Birte Siech (born 1967), German rower.

Sietch is a locality in the fictional Dune universe created by Frank Herbert.

== See also ==
- Sech (disambiguation)
- Sache (disambiguation)
- Saitch
