= Myanmar Citizens Bank =

Private commercial bank in Myanmar

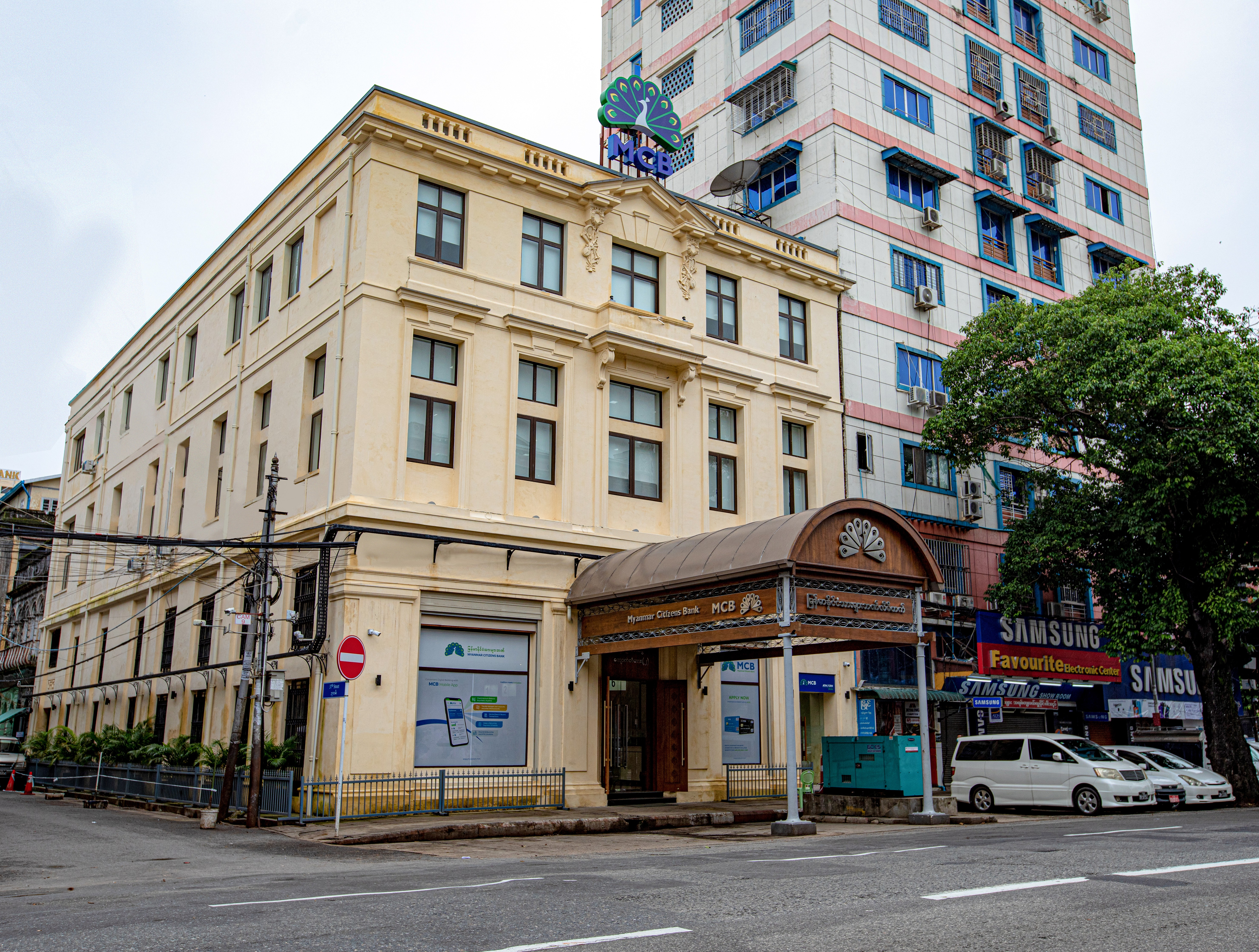
- Myanmar Citizens Bank's Head Office
- Native name: မြန်မာနိုင်ငံသားများဘဏ်
- Company type: Public
- Traded as: YSX: MCB
- ISIN: MM0000300002
- Industry: Financial services
- Founded: 1992; 34 years ago
- Headquarters: MCB Head Office, No.383, Mahar Bandula Road, Kyauktada Township, Yangon, Myanmar
- Number of locations: c. 31 cities, c. 56 Branches, 71 ATMs (2024)
- Area served: Myanmar
- Key people: Toe Aung Myint (Chairman) , Cho Cho Aye (Interim Chief Executive Officer), Khin Chaw Su Win (Chief Finance Officer), May Tet Kyin (Chief Credit Officer), Soe Win Naung (Chief Risk and Compliance Officer)
- Products: Banking services; Digital banking; Insurance; loans; Financing; Trade Service
- Operating income: MMK 5.5 Billion 633.6% (YOY)▲(2024)
- Net income: MMK 0.8 Billion 47.8% (YOY)▼ (2024)
- Total assets: MMK 981.5 Billion 50.6% pt ▲ (2024)
- Total equity: MMK 73.26 Billion ▲ (2024)
- Number of employees: c. 1100 (2024)
- Website: mcb.com.mm

Myanmar Citizens Bank (Burmese: မြန်မာနိုင်ငံသားများဘဏ်; abbreviated as MCB) is a private commercial bank in Myanmar.

The bank was established on 2 June 1992 in Yangon, Myanmar. MCB was listed on Yangon Stock Exchange on 26 August 2016. The Myanmar Citizens Bank's head office is located at No.383, Mahar Bandula Road, Kyauktada Township of Yangon. As of 2026, it had 56 Branches and 71 Automatic Teller Machines (ATMs) in 31 cities around Myanmar.

== History ==
The bank was founded in 1992. The granted registration number of the company is (274/1991-92) and it was granted on 30 October 1991.

It is partly owned by Ministry of Commerce (Myanmar). And most of the shares of the company is believed to be owned by U Ko Ko Gyi. According to the company Annual Report 2024, some of top twenty shareholders for the year (2023–2024) were : Capital Financial Holding Ltd (22.3%), Capital Diamond Star Group Ltd (15.1%), Diamond Star Co., Ltd (8.9%), Shwe Me Co., Ltd (8.0%), Good Brothers Co., Ltd (5.7%), Ministry of Commerce (Minister's Office) (4.8%), Good Brothers Machineries Co., Ltd (4.1%) and so on.

By 2022, MCB has an authorized Capital of 75 Billion Kyats and Paid up Capital of 52 Billion Kyats in the fiscal year 2016–2017. MCB has 21 branches with 560 employee as of 2016 and increased up to 46 branches in 2021.

On 5 January 2026, a Swiss global banking software provider, Temenos has joined with Myanmar Citizens Bank.
