= Sich (disambiguation) =

A sich is an administrative and military center for Cossacks.

Sich, sich or SICH may also refer to:

== Volunteer organizations ==
- Sich movement, a Ruthenian (Ukrainian) national movement of Austria-Hungary which existed in 1861-1947; influenced the creation of several other Ukrainian organizations in Central and Eastern Europe, as well as in North America.
- Sports Society Sich, a Ukrainian sports volunteer organization of firefighters (est. 1902)
  - Sich (scouting) (Січ), a Ukrainian Scout organization
  - Ukrainian Sich Riflemen (Ukrayínski sichoví striltsí) — a Ukrainian unit within the Austro-Hungarian army during World War I, based on volunteer sportsmen of the Sports Society Sich; later it laid a base for creation of the Ukrainian Galician Army
    - Sich Riflemen, one of the regular military units of the Army of the Ukrainian People's Republic, created out of the Russian-detained Austrian soldiers (Ukrainian Sich Riflemen)
  - Polissian Sich (Polisska sich), a name for the Ukrainian People's Revolutionary Army (World War II) in the region of Polissya
  - Carpathian Sich of the National Defense Organization (Karpatska sich) — a Ukrainian unit in Carpatho-Ukraine (1938-39)

== Other ==
- Sich, Iran, a village in South Khorasan Province, Iran
- sich (mathematics), a hyperbolic function in mathematics
- Motor Sich, a company in Zaporizhia, Ukraine that manufactures engines for airplanes and helicopters
- Motor Sich Airlines, an airline based in Zaporizhia, Ukraine
- Sich-1, a Ukrainian Earth observation satellite
- Sich a Getting Up Stairs, an American song from the early 1830s
- Scottish dialect of English form of the word "such"

== Acronym ==
- Symptomatic intracerebral hemorrhage

== Or see ==
- Sech (disambiguation)
