= JASDAQ =

Coordinates: 35°40′50″N 139°46′46″E

JASDAQ (Japanese: ジャスダック, Hepburn: Jasudakku), formerly the JASDAQ Securities Exchange (ジャスダック証券取引所, Jasudakku Shōken Torihikijo) is one of the sections of the Tokyo Stock Exchange. It was formerly an independent stock exchange.

While JASDAQ is not related to NASDAQ in the United States, it has operated an electronic trading system similar to NASDAQ.

== History ==
In 1963, the Japan Securities Dealers Association (日本証券業協会, Nippon Shōkengyō Kyōkai) set up an over-the-counter registration system for trading securities. This system was placed under the management of a private company, Japan OTC Securities (日本店頭証券, Nippon Tentō Shōken) in 1976.

The JASDAQ automated quotation system became operational in 1991.

In 2004, JASDAQ received a permit from the Prime Minister to reorganize as a securities exchange. It became the first new securities exchange in Japan in almost fifty years.

On April 1, 2010, the Osaka Securities Exchange acquired the JASDAQ Securities Exchange, and merged it with OSE's NEO and Nippon New Market-Hercules markets to form the "new" JASDAQ market.

== Hours ==
The exchange has pre-market sessions from 08:00am to 09:00am and normal trading sessions from 09:00am to 03:00pm on all days of the week except Saturdays, Sundays and holidays declared by the Exchange in advance.

== See also ==
- List of East Asian stock exchanges
- List of stock exchanges
