= Mothers (Tokyo Stock Exchange) =

Section of Tokyo Stock Exchange for startup companies

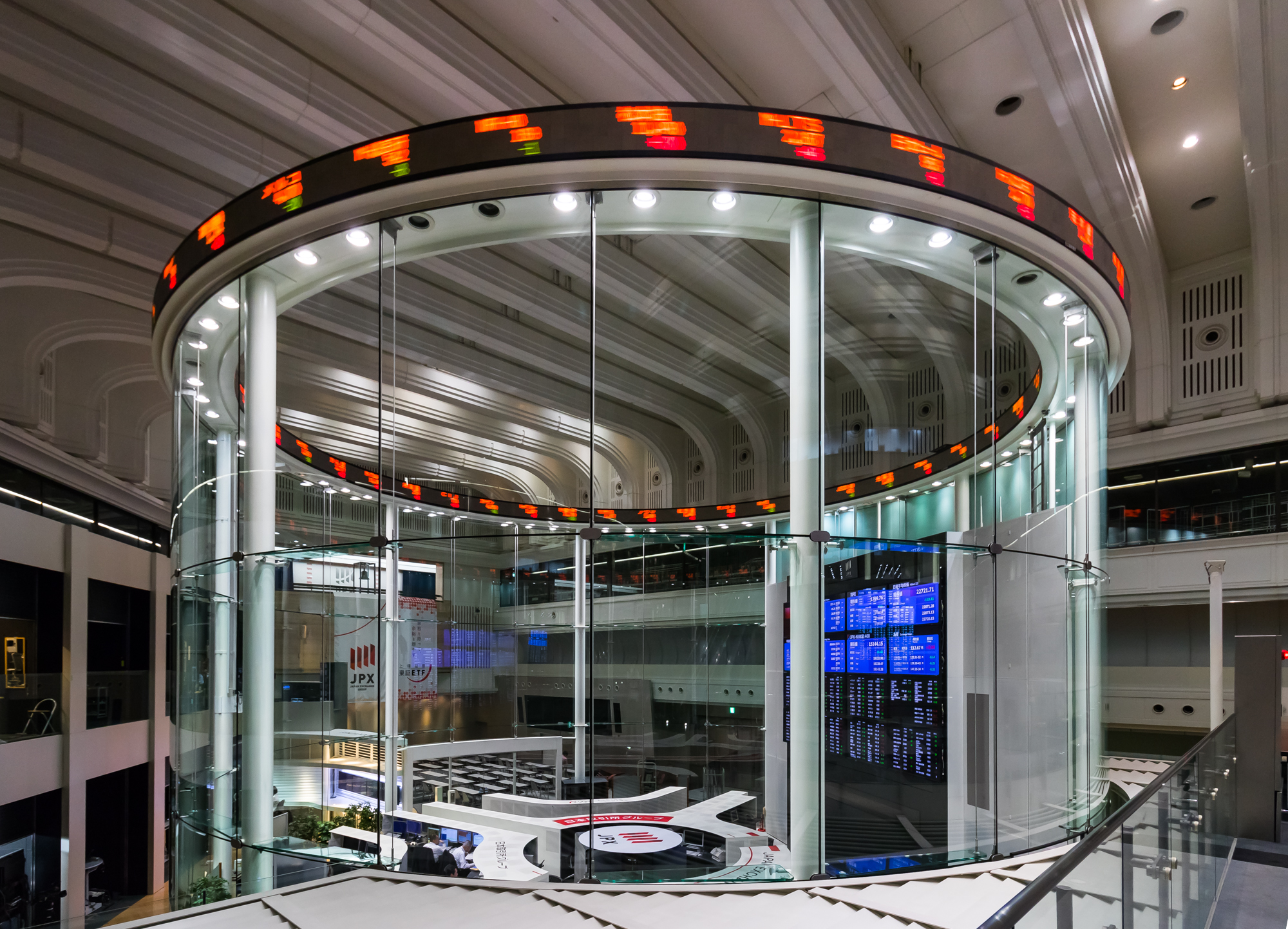
The Tokyo Stock Exchange - main room 2

Mothers (Japanese: マザーズ) was a section (market) of the Tokyo Stock Exchange, where the shares of startup companies were listed and traded. Its name is said to have come from an acronym of "Market of the high-growth and emerging stocks".

TSE also had the JASDAQ for a similar purpose but with different requirements, which it acquired when it merged with Osaka Stock Exchange to form Japan Exchange Group in 2013.

In April 2022, the TSE restructured its markets, and the companies that were in the Mothers section became part of the Growth Market.

== History ==
Mothers was established in November 1999 in Tokyo Stock Exchange, as an ante to NASDAQ Japan of Osaka Stock Exchange. In December 1999, it had its start by trading shares of two emerging companies, one of which is already delisted.

As of March 2013, the shares of 185 companies were listed in Mothers, of which 138 companies (74%) were from Tokyo; and 37.7% of all companies were in the IT industry, and 21.1% from the Service industry. As of March 31, 2018, 245 companies' shares were listed in Mothers, against 701 companies in JASDAQ.

== See also ==
- Japan Exchange Group
- Tokyo Stock Exchange
- JASDAQ
