= Securities and Exchange Commission of Myanmar =

Government regulatory body overseeing the stock market

- မြန်မာနိုင်ငံ ငွေချေးသက်သေခံလက်မှတ်လုပ်ငန်း ကြီးကြပ်ရေးကော်မရှင်

Agency overview
- Formed: 24 February 2015; 11 years ago
- Jurisdiction: Myanmar (Burma)
- Agency executives: Maung Maung Win, Chairman; Tin Tin Ohn, Director-General
- Parent Agency: Ministry of Planning and Finance
- Website: secm.gov.mm

The Securities and Exchange Commission of Myanmar (SECM; Burmese: မြန်မာနိုင်ငံ ငွေချေးသက်သေခံလက်မှတ်လုပ်ငန်း ကြီးကြပ်ရေးကော်မရှင်) is a financial regulatory authority that oversees Myanmar's liquid securities market, including the Yangon Stock Exchange. SECM was formed under the 2013 Securities and Exchange Law under the Ministry of Planning and Finance. SECM is currently chaired by Maung Maung Win.
