= Seč Reservoir =

Seč
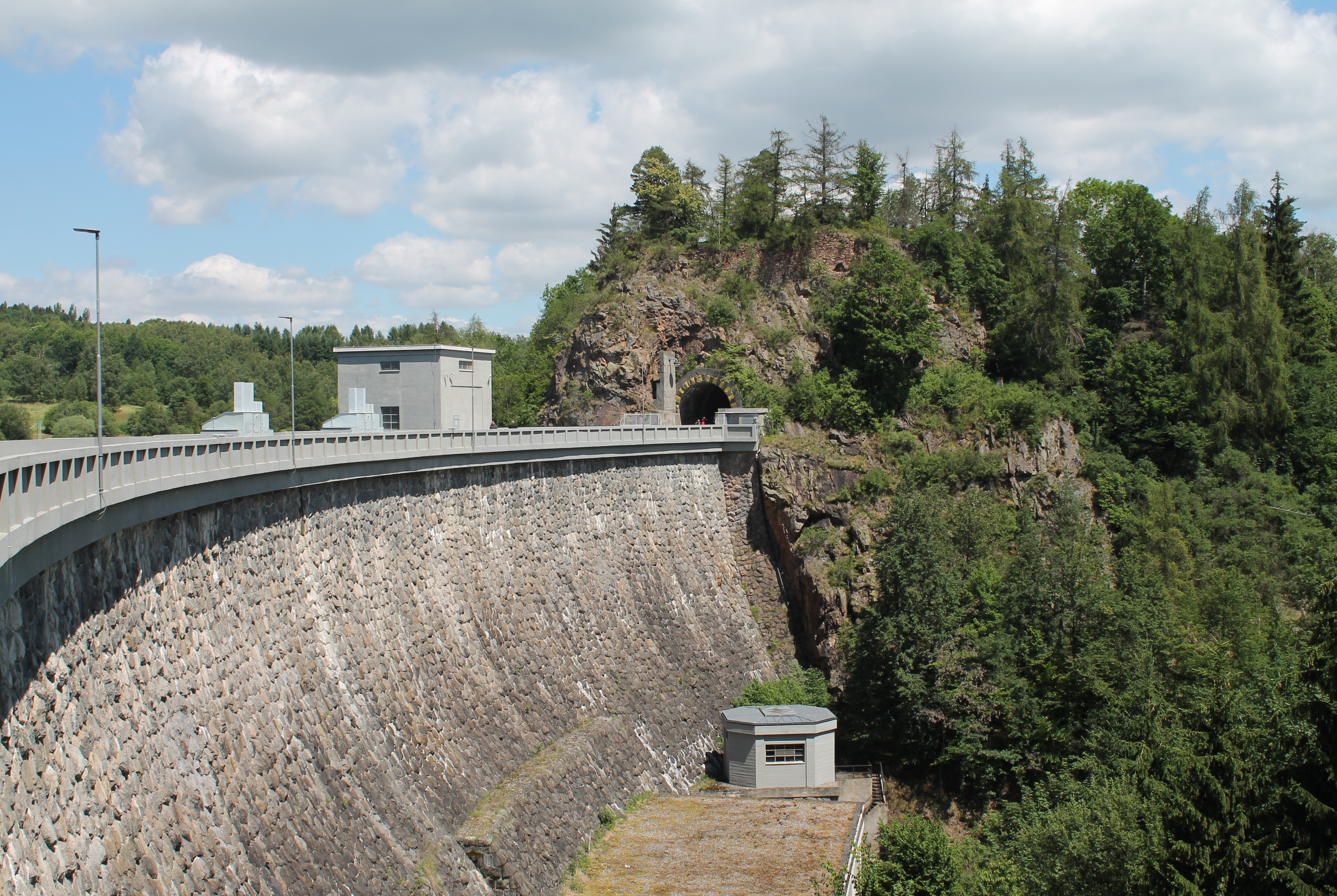
- The dam

- Location within Czech Republic
- Location: Seč, Czech Republic
- Coordinates: 49°50′0″N 15°39′1″E
- Type: reservoir
- Primary inflows: Chrudimka
- Primary outflows: Chrudimka
- Basin countries: Czech Republic
- Max. length: 7 km (4.3 mi)
- Surface area: 220 ha (540 acres)
- Water volume: 22×10^{6} m^{3} (18,000 acre⋅ft)
- Surface elevation: 490.5 m (1,609 ft)

Seč Reservoir (Czech: vodní nádrž Seč) is an artificial drinking water reservoir in the Pardubice Region, Czech Republic. It supplies the city of Pardubice and the town of Chrudim and is also an important tourist destination located in the Iron Mountains. The reservoir has also regulatory function and its water is used in some water power plants.

== Location ==
Seč Reservoir is the largest reservoir in the Iron Mountains Protected Landscape Area. It is located on the Chrudimka River in a valley close to the town of the same name, about 20 km (12 mi) from Chrudim and 25 km (16 mi) from Pardubice. The reservoir is approx. 7 km (4 mi) long and is situated at 490 m (1,610 ft) above the sea level.

== History ==
The dam was constructed between 1925 and 1934 as a protection against floods. As a result of the construction, 22 buildings were depopulated and flooded. Remains of some of them are popular destination for scuba divers. A small power plant was constructed between 1941 and 1946. In 1947 another smaller reservoir was constructed approx 1 km from the main reservoir and it is called Seč II.

The dam during Open Day in March 2025

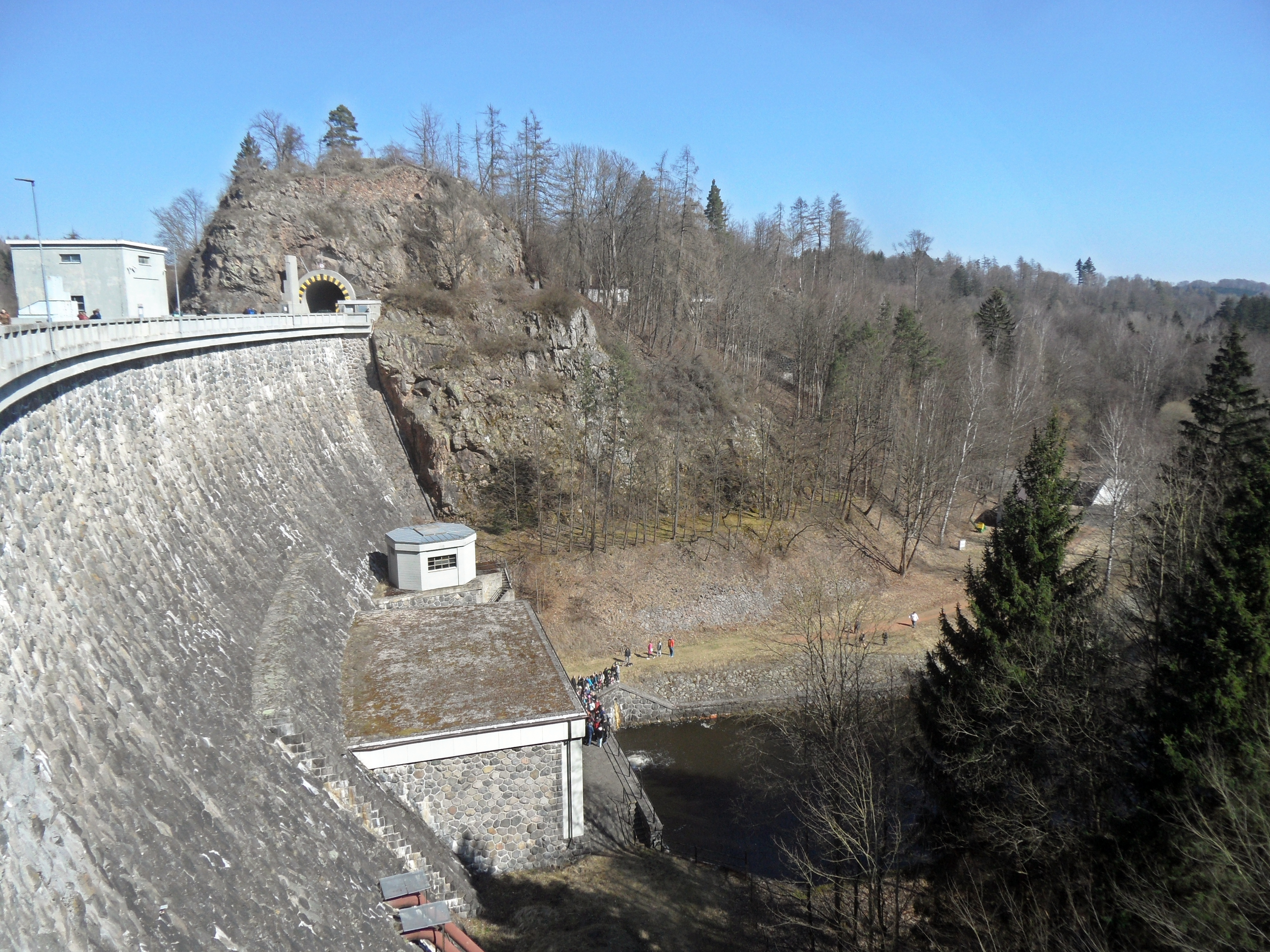
Overview of the dam with visitors below

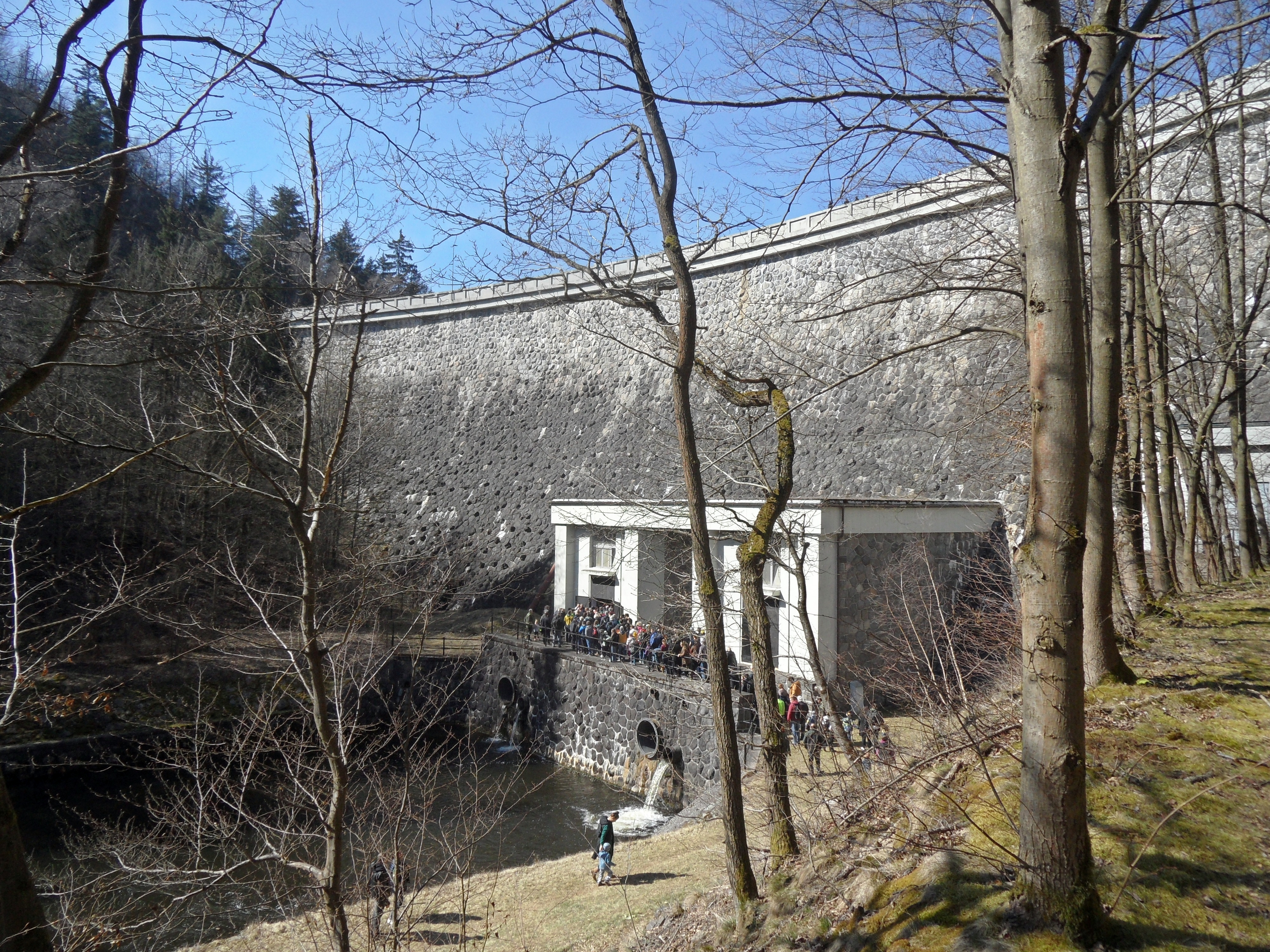
The Open Day attracted many visitors

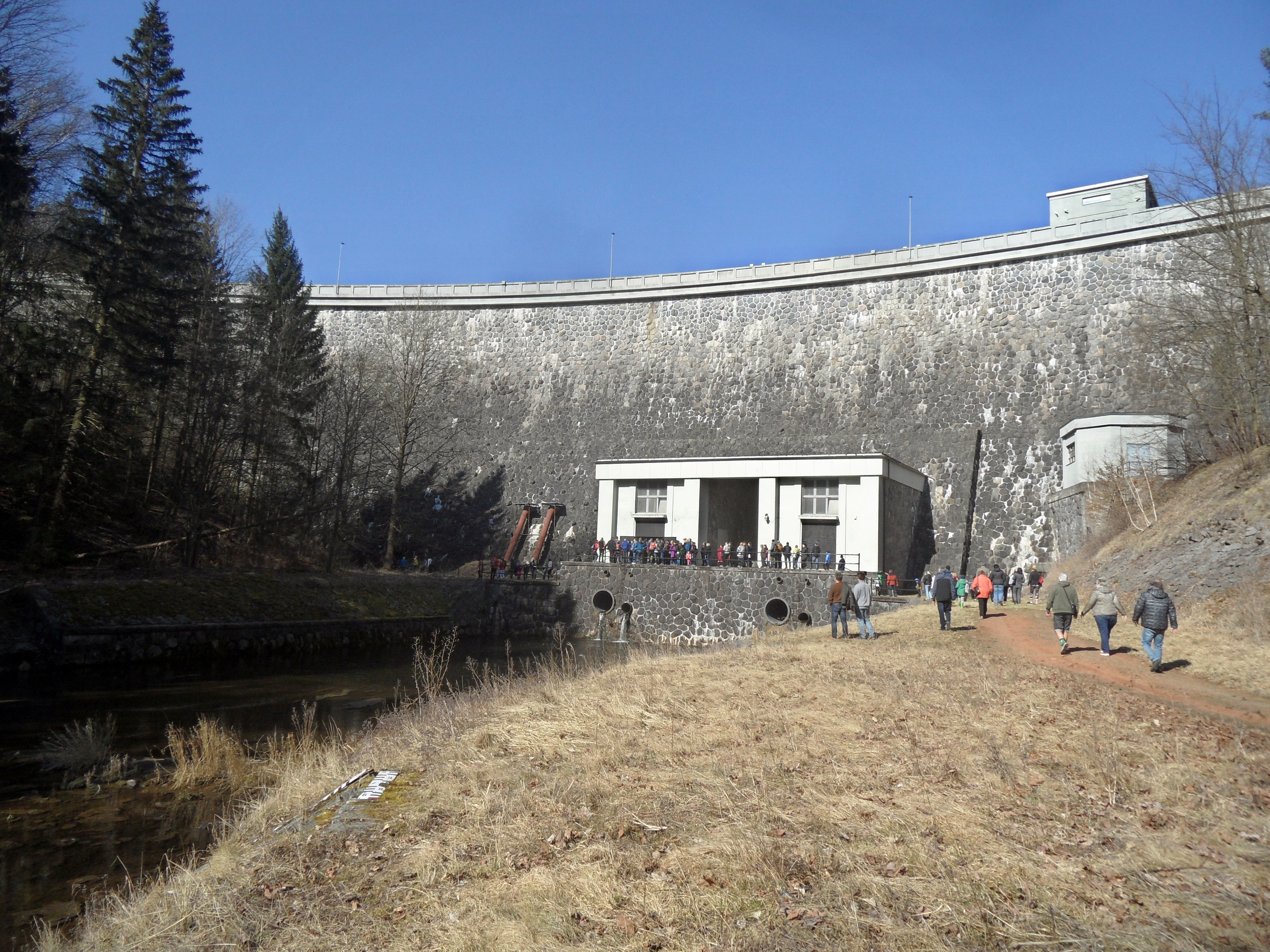
The Open Day attracted many visitors

The machinery controlling the water tank outlet gates and other equipment was manufactured by the famous engineering company Škoda Works from Plzeň. The inspection corridor runs lengthwise through the dam at different height levels.

The dimensions of the concreted corridor are approximately 1 × 2 metres. The total length is approximately 100 metres from the left embankment to the right embankment. The entrance is provided by two transverse corridors, each 13 metres long, which are protected by steel doors. The necessary equipment for monitoring the dam is also placed inside the inspection corridor.

The machinery from Škoda Works and the inspection corridor

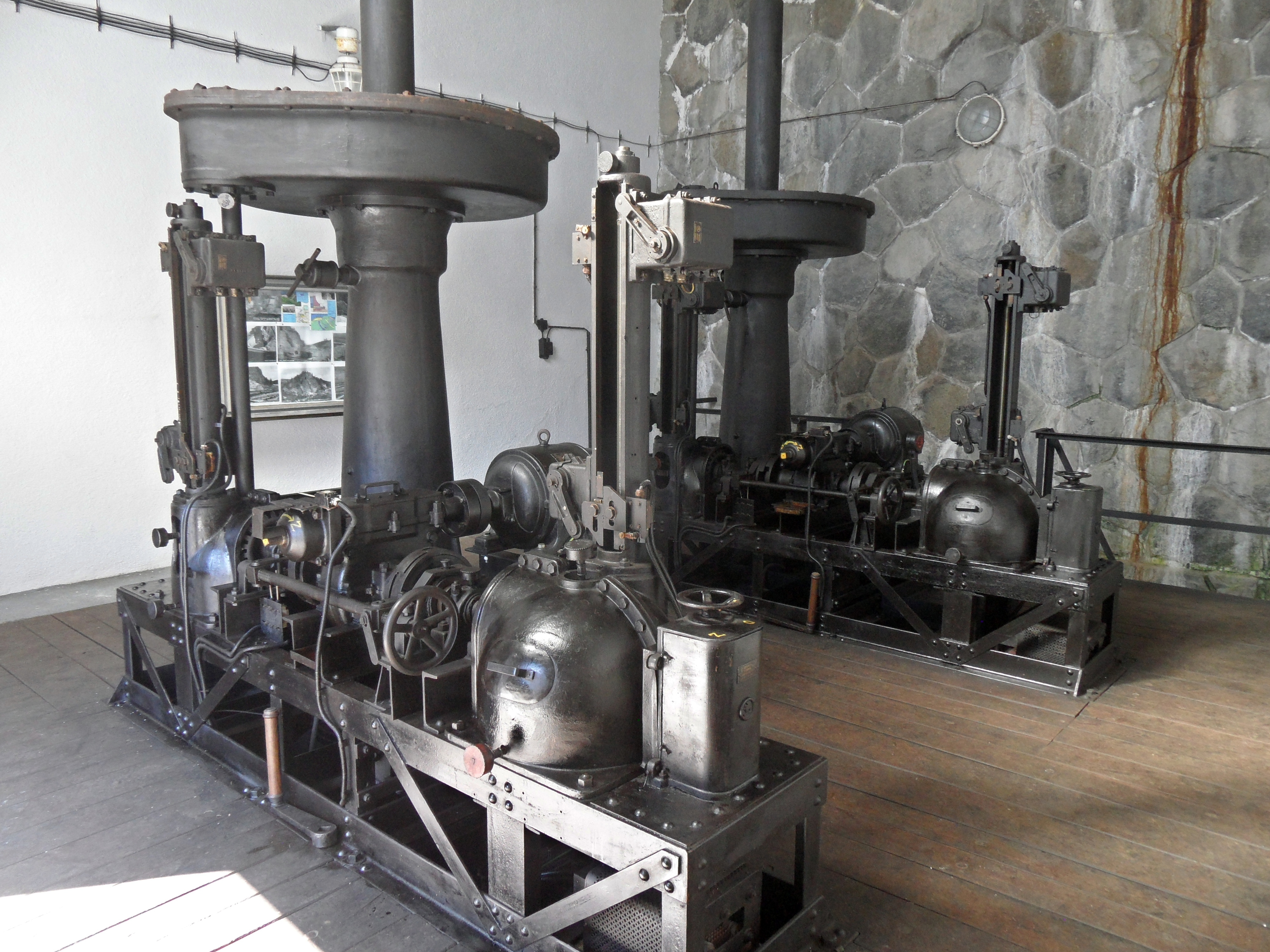
The machinery from Škoda Works

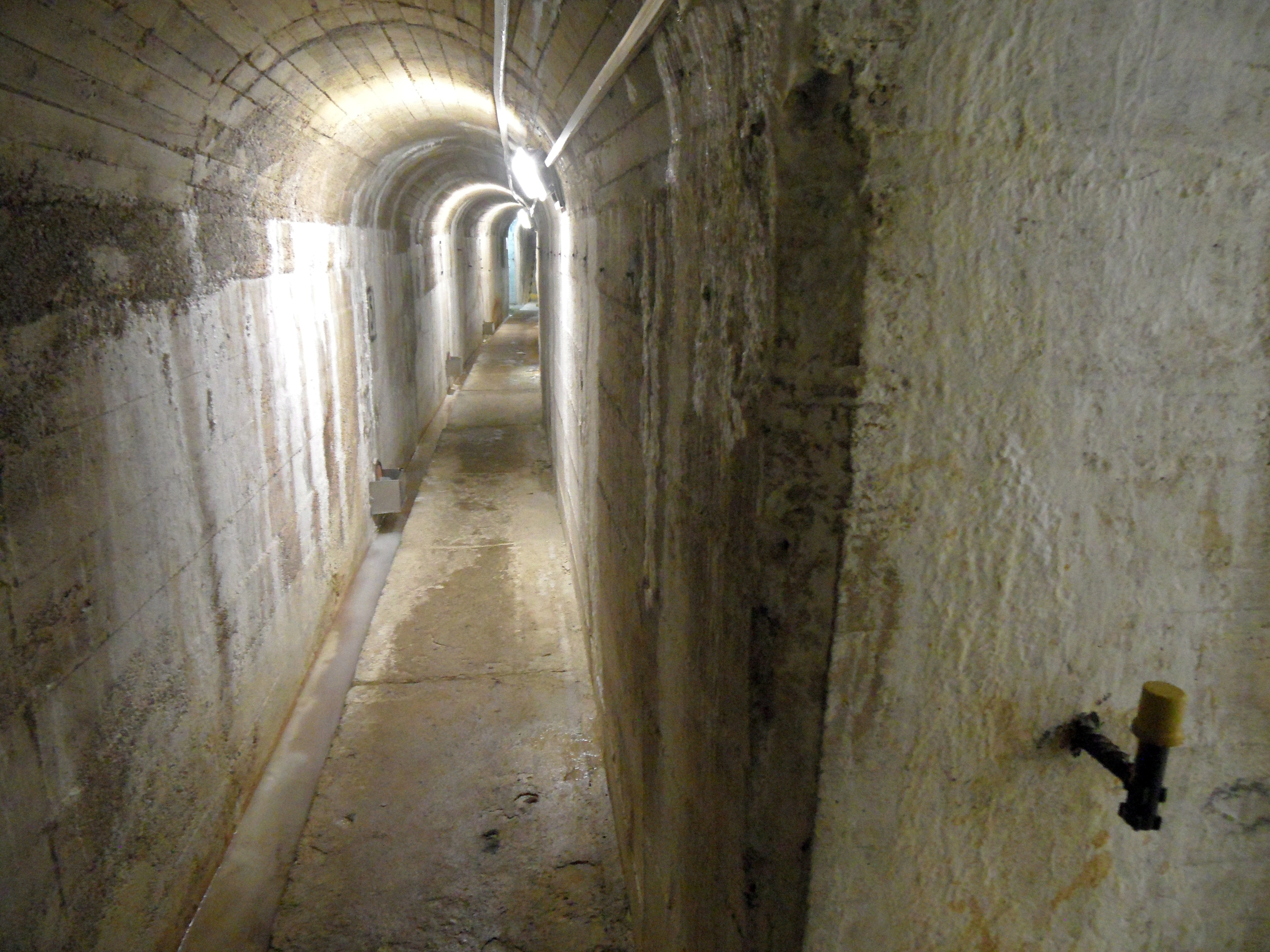
Part of the inspection corridor

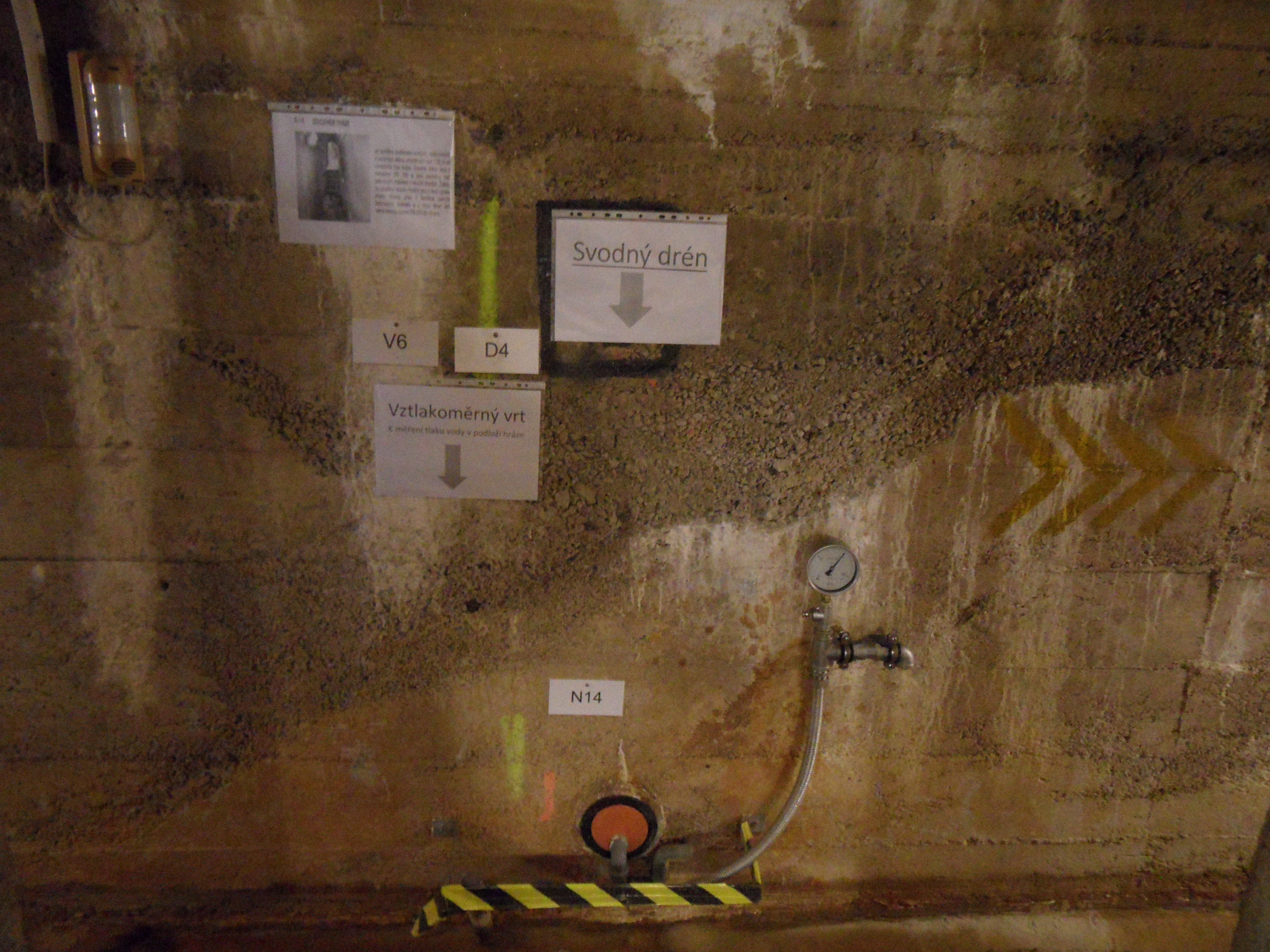
Some of the monitoring equipment inside the corridor

Few years later, during World War II, the construction of the hydroelectric power plant began. Quite unique wooden pipe with a diameter of two metres was used on most of the route to the power station. The main reason for this unique solution was probably the fact that the Nazi administration did not allow the use of scarce steel, which was used for weapons production. The wooden pipes were used until 2010, when they were replaced by new steel pipes. Fragments of the original wooden pipes are on display in three places in the town of Seč: in front of the castle, near the power station and near the caravan site.

Fragments of the original wooden pipes

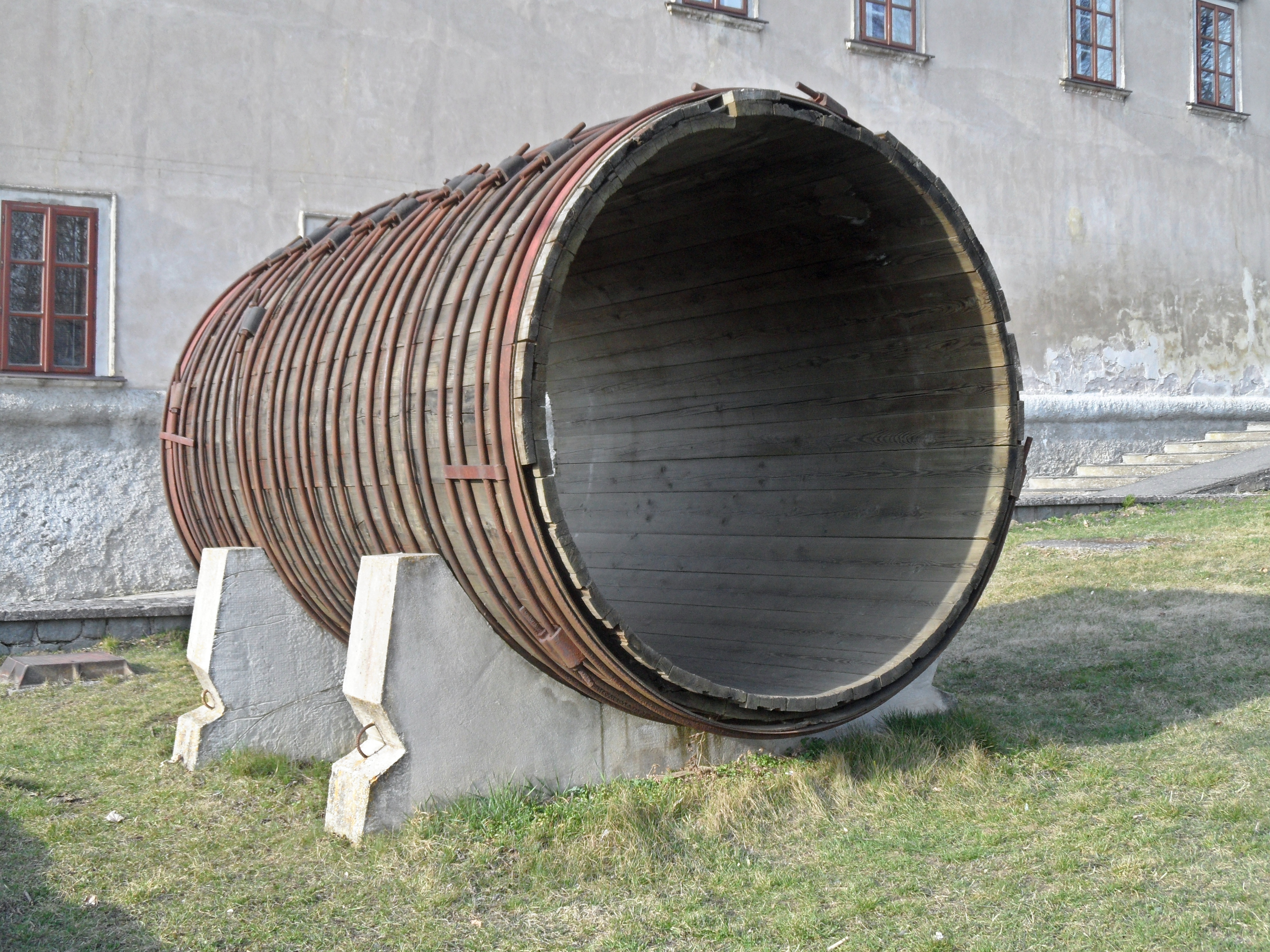
In front of the castle

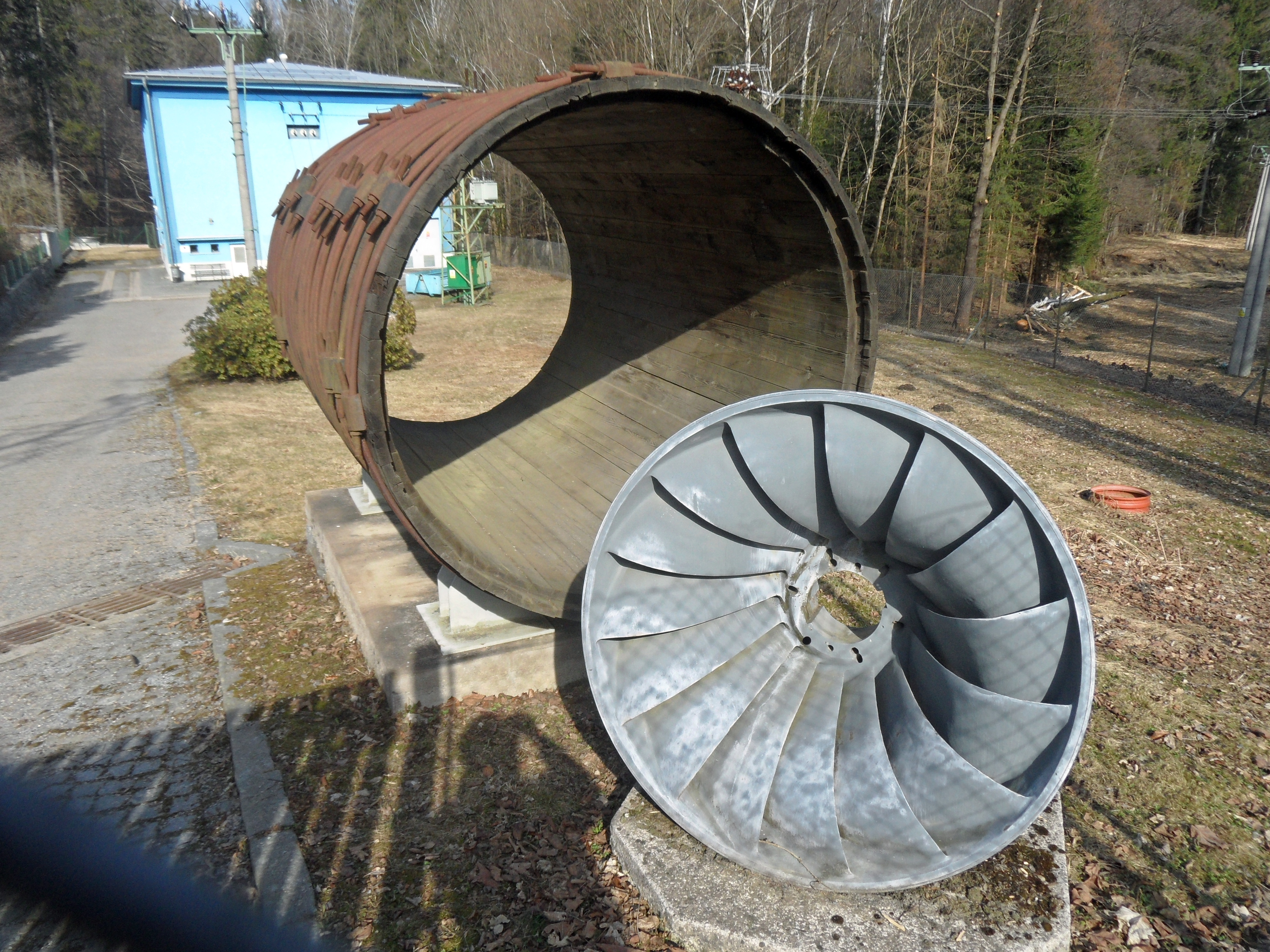
Near the power station

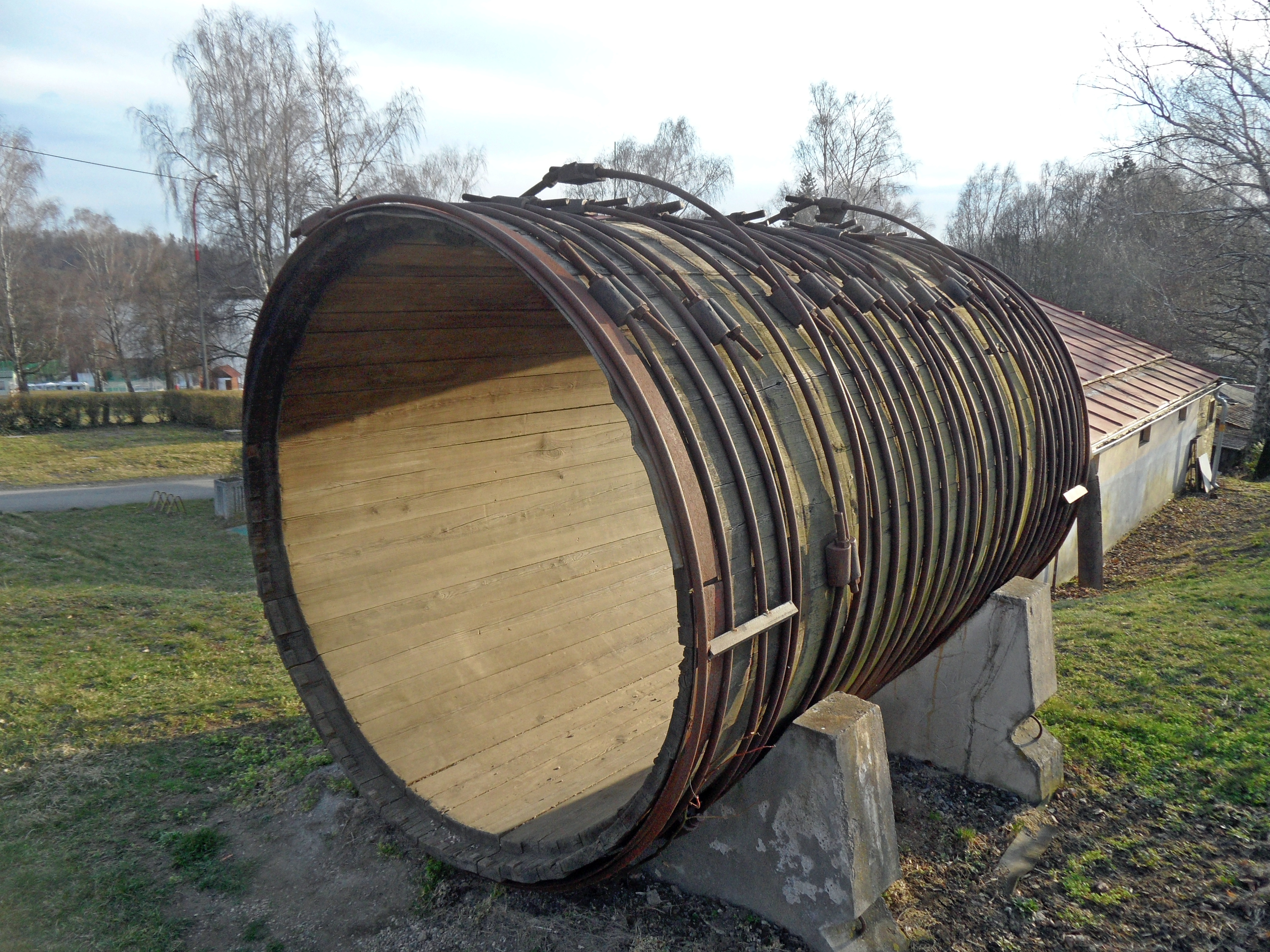
Near the caravan site

== Biosystem ==
The environmentally most valuable part of Seč are Ostrůvek and the Oheb peninsula, which consists of a steep rock that ends with a small rocky promontory covered with pines. This place is a home to some rare invertebrate species (snails, beetles) as well as a natural habitat of Eurasian eagle-owls. The forest that covers the Oheb rock consists of some very old species of European beeches. Dead trees are left to decay and become hosts for a wide range of polypores that feed on their dead wood.

== Tourism ==
The reservoir and its surroundings are the main tourist attraction of the Iron Mountains. It is used for recreational purposes and water sports.

== Ecology ==
Oheb and Ostrůvek are protected natural areas threatened by tourists that visit these sites. Another ecological issue is the wastewater from surrounding villages and recreational objects that contaminates the reservoir. It does not represent a direct risk to the people who swim in the water but it causes algal bloom. In some cases, large areas of green "tufts" can be observed. This was originally believed to be caused by manure washed down from the fields close to the reservoir, but results of recent researches proved that fluoride compounds from manure are insoluble in water so it cannot be the primary cause. The algal bloom season on Seč may start as soon as in June and gets worse when there's lack of rain which reduces the water flow. It is recommended to have a shower after swimming in the water or avoid entering the water when the situations worsens.

== Gallery ==
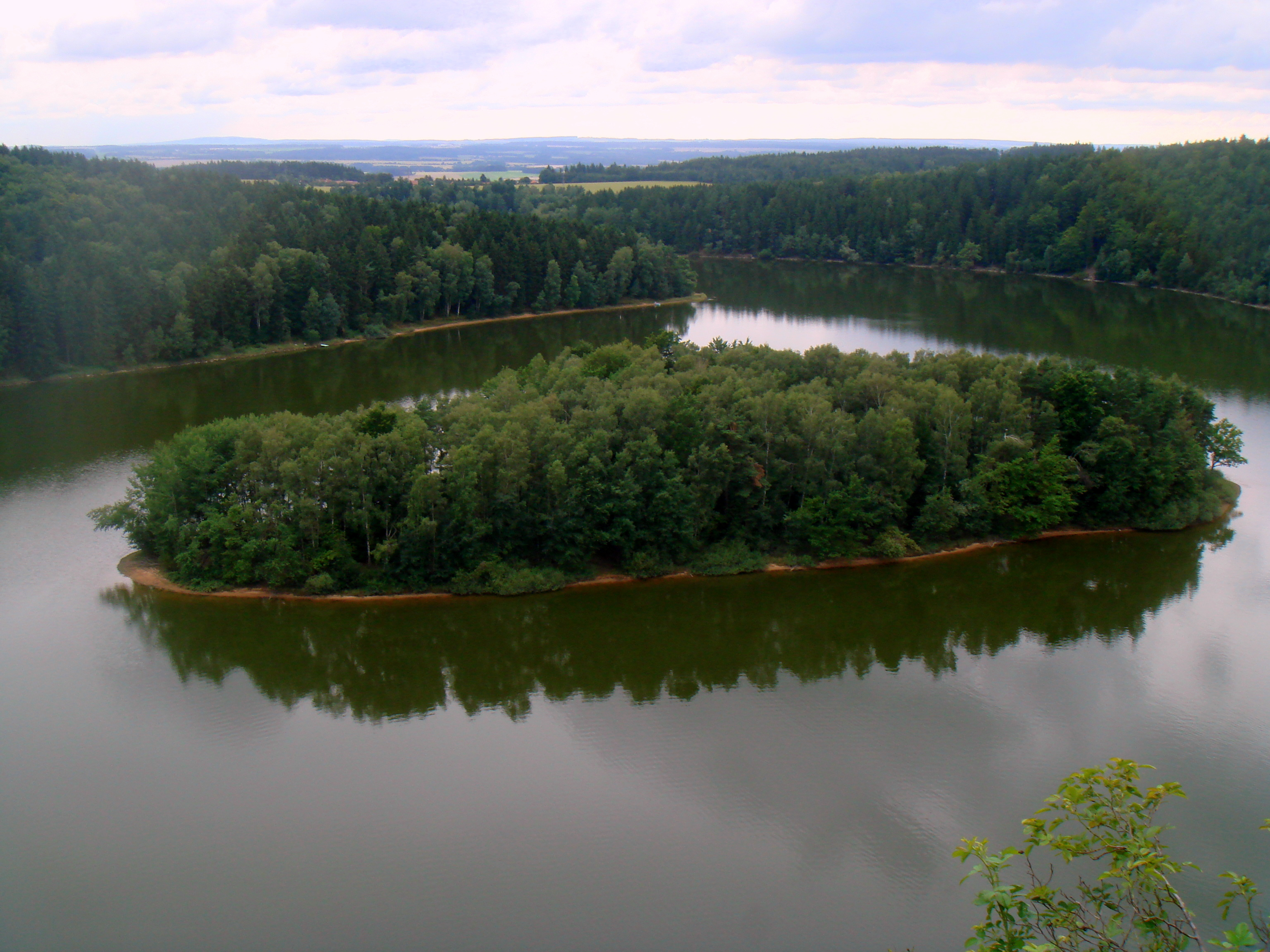
Ostrůvek

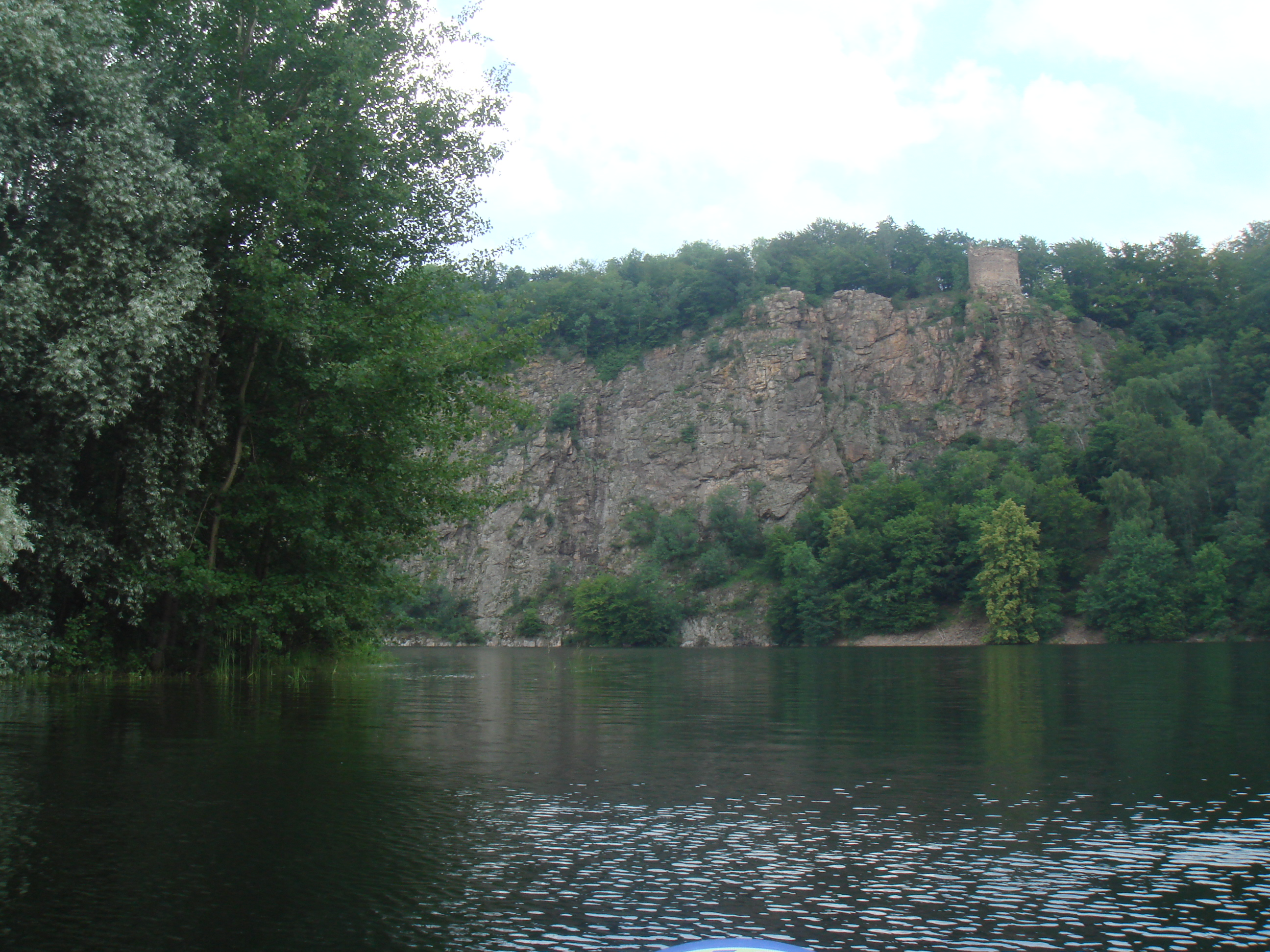
The Oheb rock (view from the reservoir)

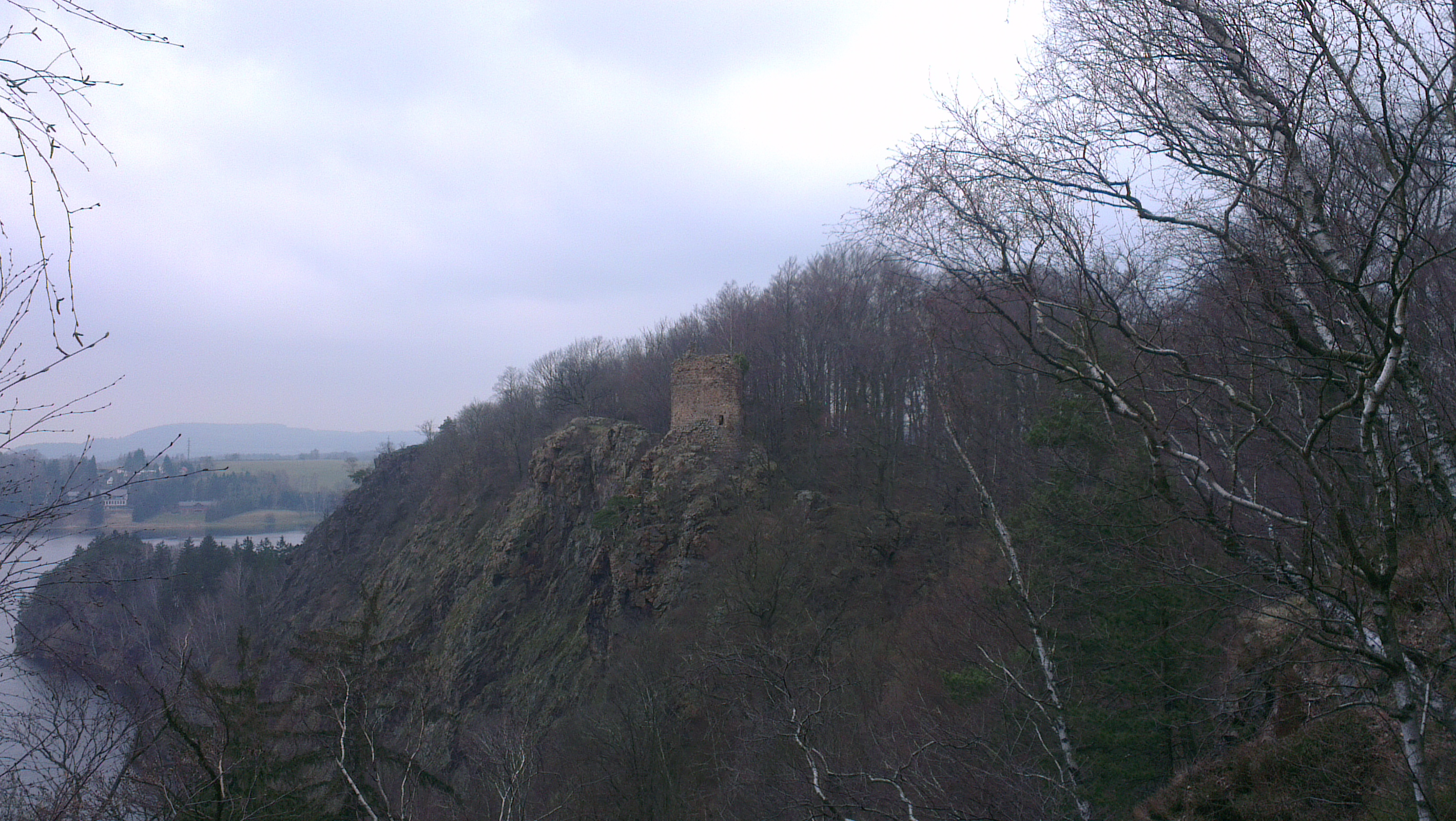
The Oheb rock and peninsula

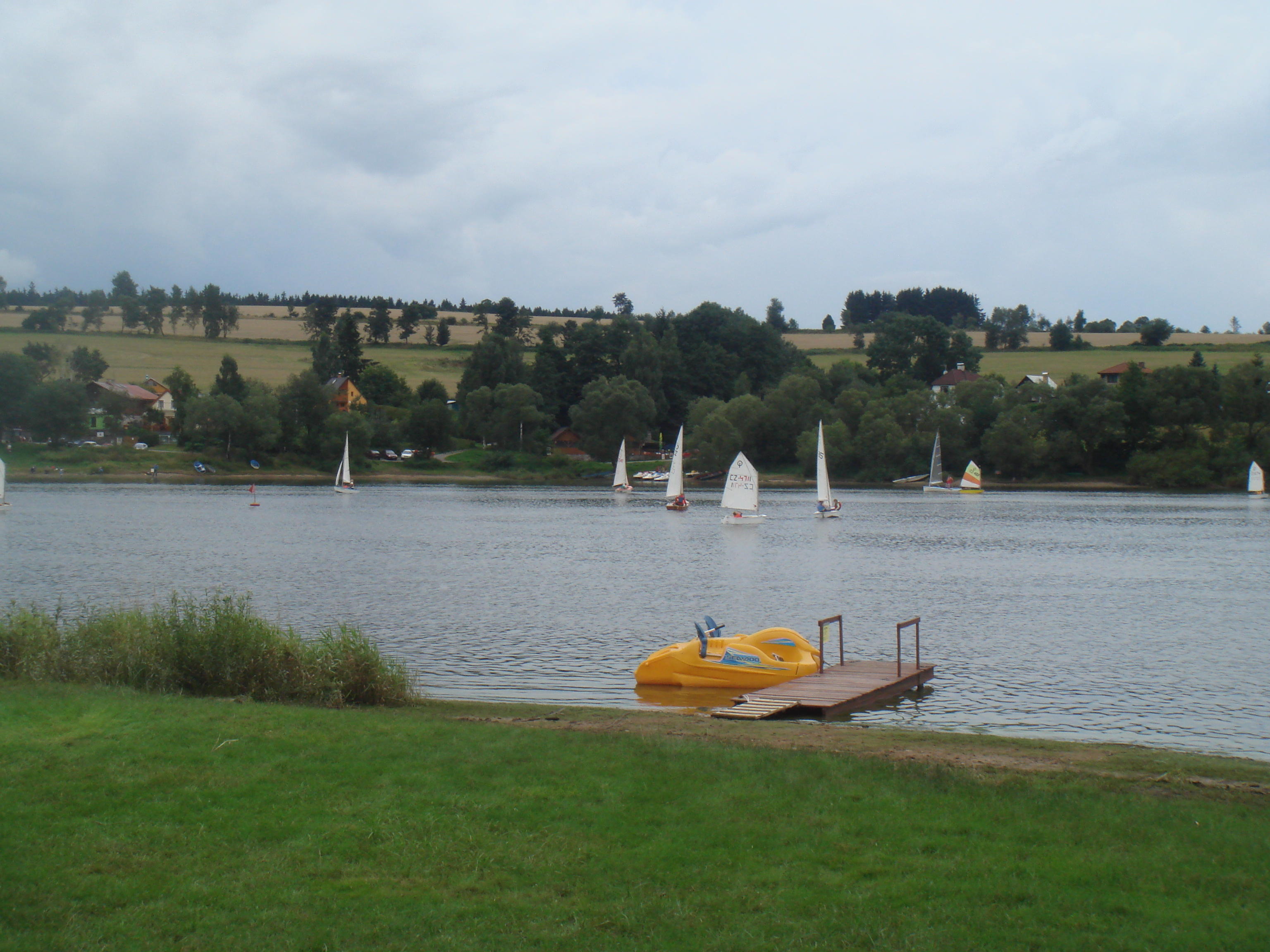
Ústupky

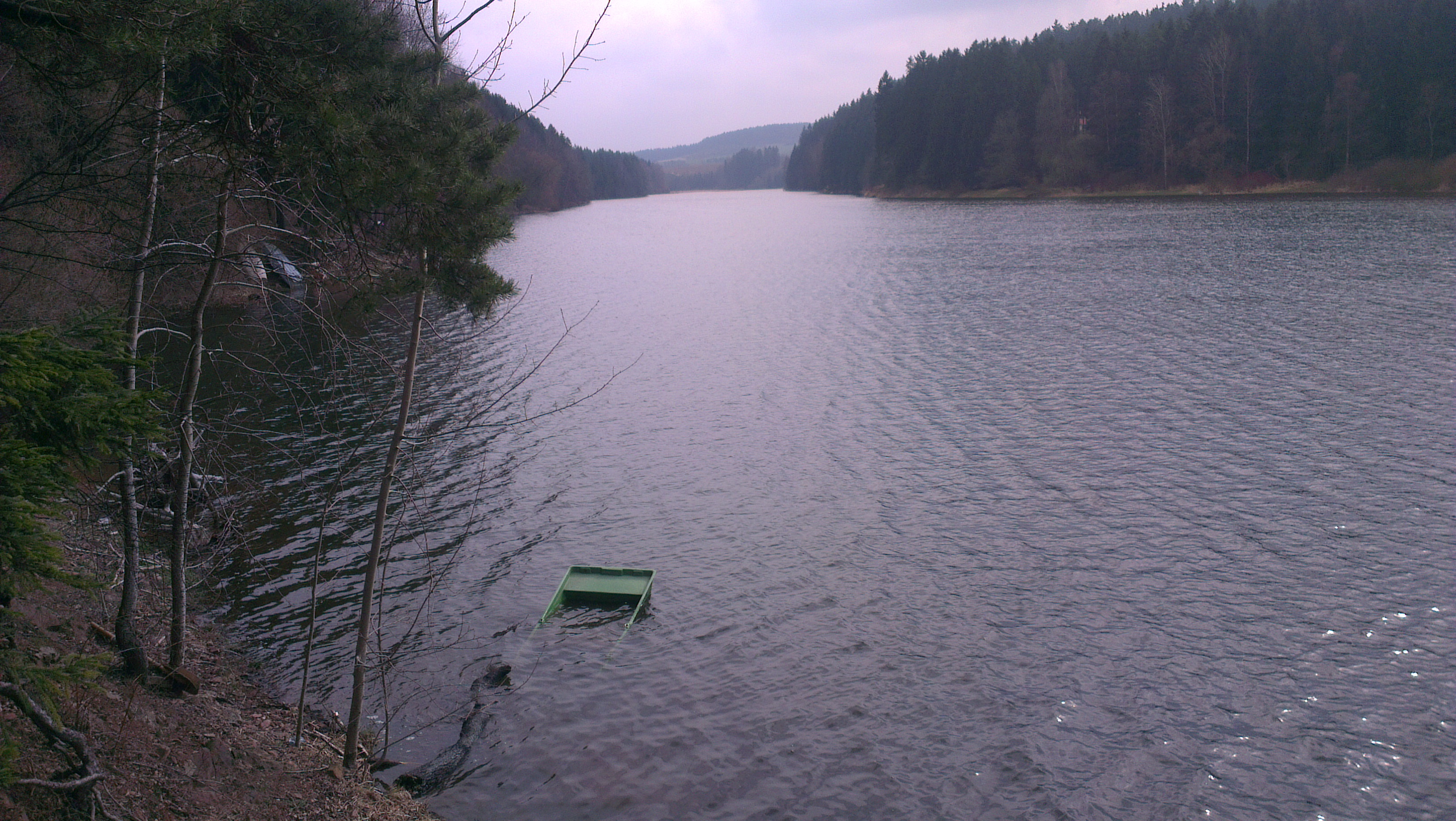
The reservoir (view towards the tributary)
