= Seč (Chrudim District) =

- Town
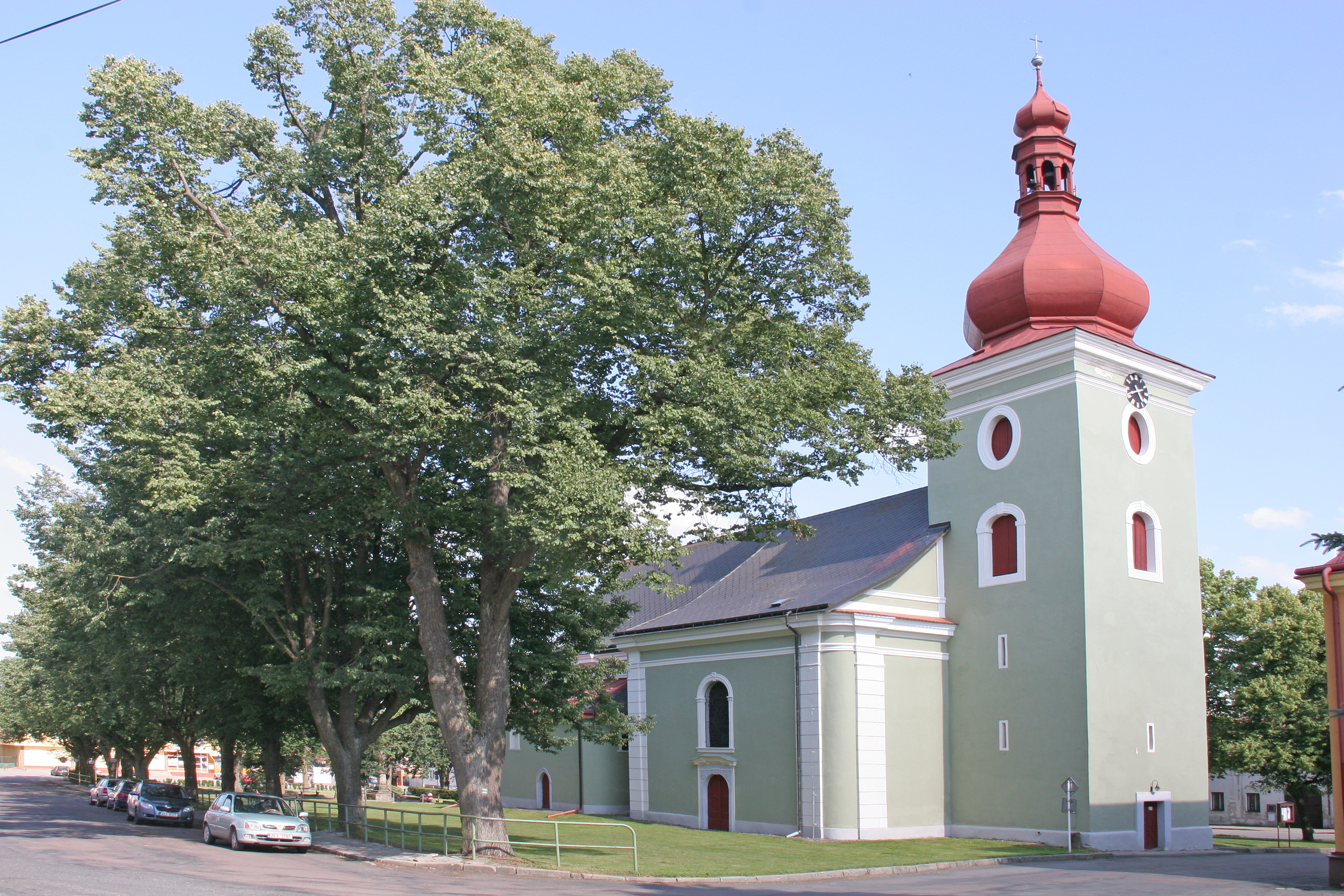
- Church of Saint Lawrence

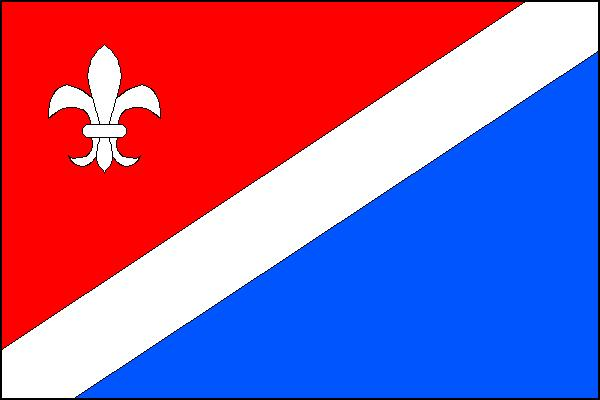
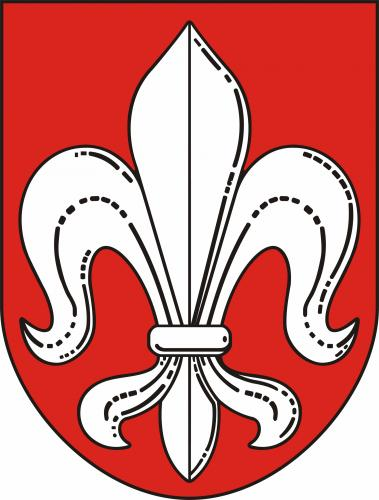
- Flag Coat of arms

- Location in the Czech Republic
- Coordinates: 49°50′49″N 15°39′23″E
- Country: Czech Republic
- Region: Pardubice
- District: Chrudim
- First mentioned: 1318

Government
  - Mayor: Marcel Vojtěch

Area
  - Total: 36.68 km^{2} (14.16 sq mi)
- Elevation: 532 m (1,745 ft)

Population (2026-01-01)
  - Total: 1,869
  - Density: 50.95/km^{2} (132.0/sq mi)
- Time zone: UTC+1 (CET)
  - Summer (DST): UTC+2 (CEST)
- Postal codes: 538 05, 538 07, 538 43
- Website: www.mestosec.cz

Seč (Czech pronunciation: [ˈsɛtʃ]; German: Setsch) is a town in Chrudim District in the Pardubice Region of the Czech Republic. It has about 1,900 inhabitants. The town is located near the Chrudimka River in the Iron Mountains.

== Administrative division ==
Seč consists of ten municipal parts (in brackets population according to the 2021 census):

- Seč (1,228)
- Hoješín (108)
- Javorka (1)
- Kraskov (217)
- Počátky (126)
- Proseč (37)
- Prosíčka (13)
- Přemilov (4)
- Ústupky (36)
- Žďárec u Seče (125)

== Etymology ==
The Old Czech word seč is derived from the verb sekat ('cut', 'chop'). This word denoted a place cut out in the forest (a glade).

== Geography ==
Seč is located about 15 kilometres (9 mi) southwest of Chrudim and 22 km (14 mi) southwest of Pardubice. It lies in the Iron Mountains and in the Železné hory Protected Landscape Area. Seč Reservoir is built next to the town on the Chrudimka River.

== History ==
The first written mention of Seč is from 1318. The settlement was founded during the colonisation of the Iron Mountains in the 12th and 13th centuries. In 1499, Seč became a market town, and in 1853, it was promoted to a town. It lost the town status in 1954, but regained it in 2007.

== Demographics ==
Historical population

Year	Pop.	±%
1869	3,263	—
1880	3,269	+0.2%
1890	3,103	−5.1%
1900	2,767	−10.8%
1910	2,917	+5.4%

Year	Pop.	±%
1921	2,841	−2.6%
1930	2,730	−3.9%
1950	1,914	−29.9%
1961	2,000	+4.5%
1970	1,858	−7.1%

Year	Pop.	±%
1980	1,790	−3.7%
1991	1,776	−0.8%
2001	1,707	−3.9%
2011	1,828	+7.1%
2021	1,895	+3.7%

Source: Censuses

== Transport ==
There are no railways or major roads passing through the municipal territory.

== Sights ==
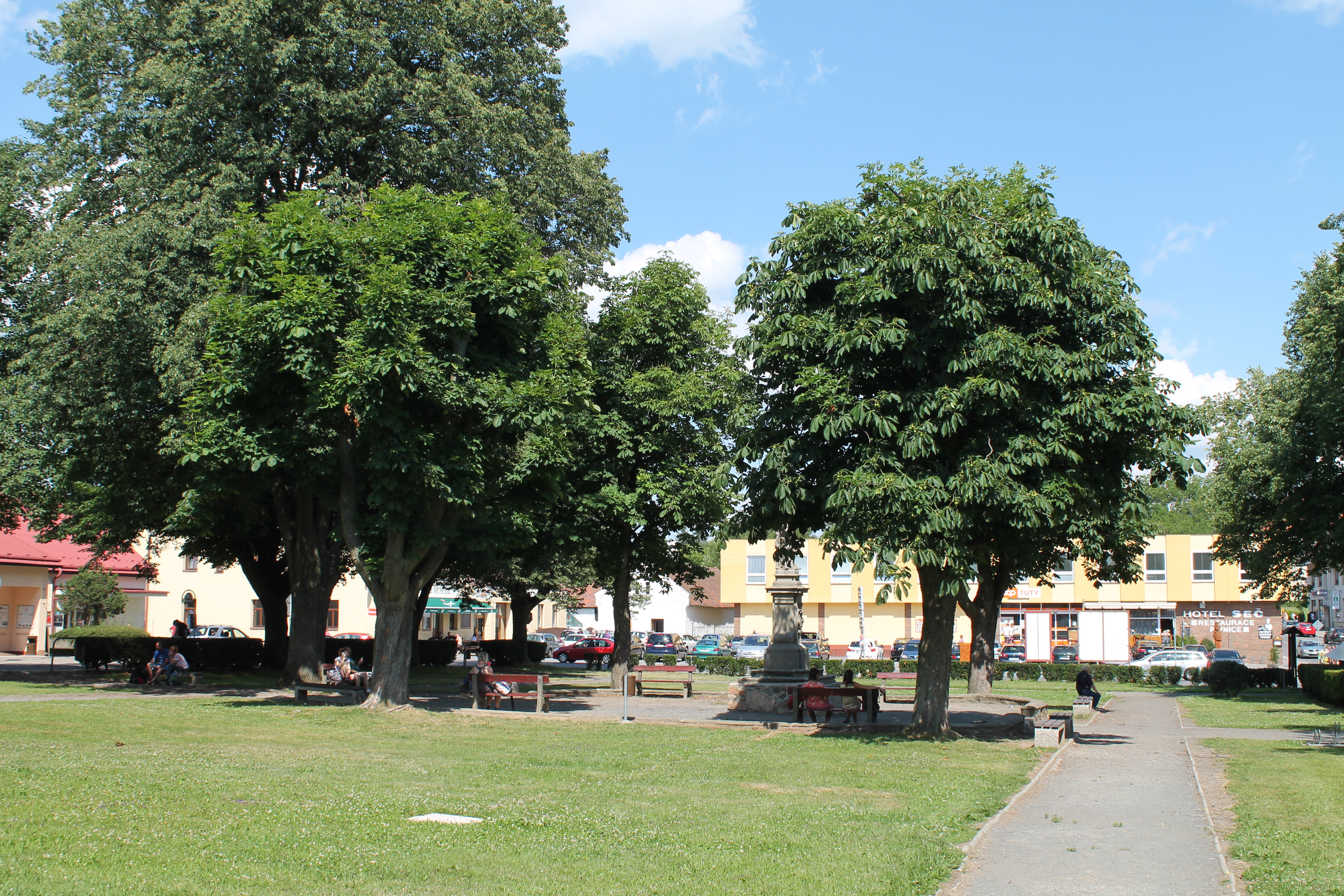
Town square

The main landmarks of the town are the Church of Saint Lawrence, built in the Renaissance style in 1610–1620, and the Renaissance castle, which dates from the turn of the 16th and 17th centuries and today serves as the municipal office.

== Notable people ==
- Vincenc Strouhal (1850–1922), physicist

== Twin towns – sister cities ==
Seč is twinned with:

- Radzovce, Slovakia
