= Vidlatá Seč =

- Municipality
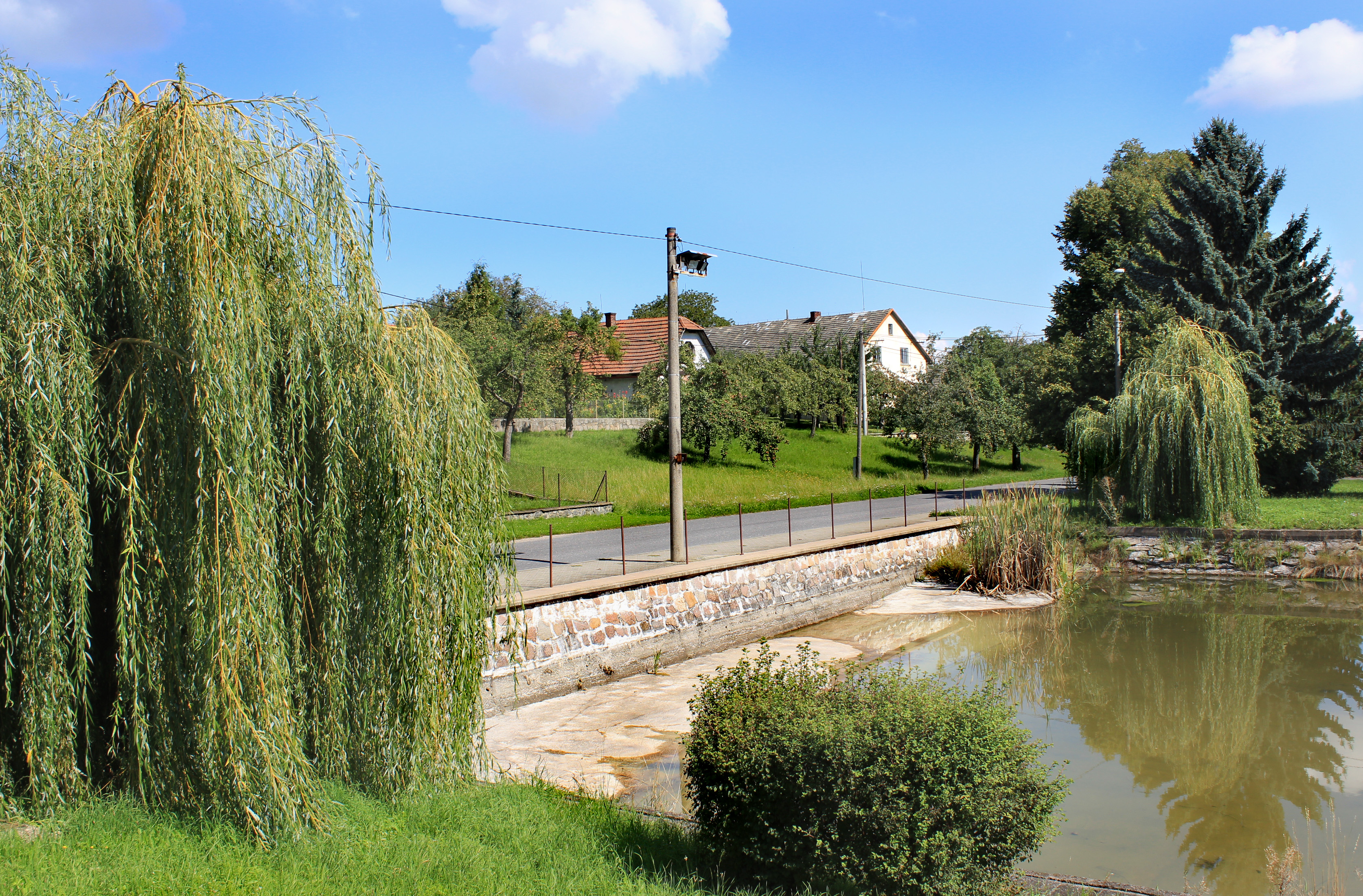
- Centre of Vidlatá Seč

- Flag Coat of arms

- Location in the Czech Republic
- Coordinates: 49°50′10″N 16°12′19″E
- Country: Czech Republic
- Region: Pardubice
- District: Svitavy
- First mentioned: 1167

Area
  - Total: 6.10 km^{2} (2.36 sq mi)
- Elevation: 426 m (1,398 ft)

Population (2026-01-01)
  - Total: 292
  - Density: 47.9/km^{2} (124/sq mi)
- Time zone: UTC+1 (CET)
  - Summer (DST): UTC+2 (CEST)
- Postal code: 570 01
- Website: www.vidlatasec.cz

Vidlatá Seč is a municipality and village in Svitavy District in the Pardubice Region of the Czech Republic. It has about 300 inhabitants.

Vidlatá Seč lies approximately 21 kilometres (13 mi) north-west of Svitavy, 39 km (24 mi) south-east of Pardubice, and 132 km (82 mi) east of Prague.

== Demographics ==
Historical population
Year	Pop.	±%
1869	529	—
1880	536	+1.3%
1890	524	−2.2%
1900	506	−3.4%
1910	525	+3.8%
1921	503	−4.2%
1930	490	−2.6%
1950	346	−29.4%
1961	340	−1.7%
1970	295	−13.2%
1980	293	−0.7%
1991	310	+5.8%
2001	298	−3.9%
2011	273	−8.4%
2021	292	+7.0%
Source: Censuses
