= Myanma Economic Bank =

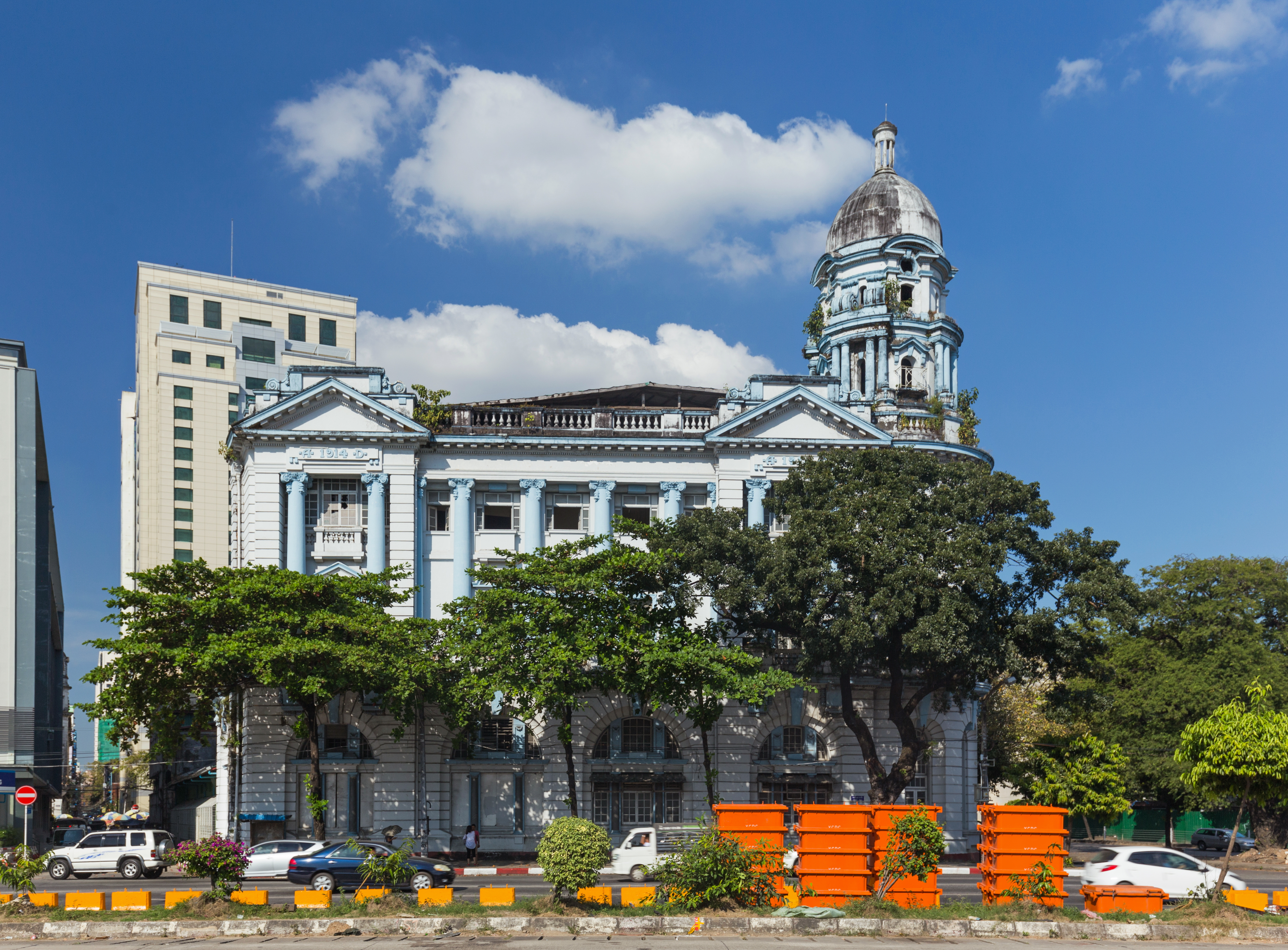
- Native name: မြန်မာ့စီးပွားရေးဘဏ်
- Formerly: Burma Economic Bank
- Industry: Banking
- Founded: April 2, 1976 in Rangoon, Burma
- Headquarters: No. 26, Thiri Kyaw Swa Street, Naypyidaw, Myanmar
- Website: meb.gov.mm

Myanma Economic Bank (Burmese: မြန်မာ့စီးပွားရေးဘဏ်; abbreviated MEB) is a commercial public bank in Myanmar (Burma).

== History ==
Burma Economic Bank was established as a subsidiary of the State Commercial Bank (SCB) on 2 April 1976, under the Bank Act of 1975. The law reversed a 1967 law (the People's Bank of the Union of Burma Act of 1967), by splitting the People's Bank into four separate state-owned banks, namely the Union of Burma Bank (UBB), the Burma Economic Bank (BEB), the Burma Foreign Trade Bank (BFTB) and the Burma Agricultural Bank (BAB). In 1963, all banks were nationalized as a result of the Burmese Way to Socialism. The Burmese government had previously consolidated all of these nationalized banks under the People's Bank of the Union of Burma. At its establishment, the Burma Economic Bank was formed to serve as the primary deposit-taking and general banking institution.

In 1989, the Myanma Investment and Commercial Bank (MICB) was separated from MEB to provide specialized corporate and investment banking services. In 1993, the Myanma Small Loans Enterprise (MSLE) was separated from MEB. MEB, along with 4 other Burmese banks, was authorized to deal in foreign banking in March 2004.

In December 2013, Daiwa Securities Group and Japan Exchange Group announced that they had entered into a joint venture agreement with Myanma Economic Bank to establish the Yangon Stock Exchange.
