= Yangon Stock Exchange =

Financial building in Yangon, Myanmar

Coordinates: 16°46′17.3″N 96°32′32.6″E

- YSX
- Type: Stock Exchange
- Location: Yangon, Myanmar
- Founded: October 2015
- Key people: U Win Naing Oo, Managing Director
- Currency: Myanmar Kyat
- No. of listings: 8 (August, 2023)
- Market cap: Ks.716 billion (2023) $341.38 Million
- Indices: MYANPIX
- Website: ysx-mm.com

The Yangon Stock Exchange (Burmese: ရန်ကုန်စတော့အိတ်ချိန်း; abbreviated YSX) opened in December 2015, at the former Central Bank of Myanmar and Myawaddy Bank headquarters in Yangon.

As of 2017, the stock exchange had only four listings.

== History ==
On 23 December 2014, two Japanese firms, Daiwa Institute of Research, the research arm of Daiwa Securities Group and Japan Exchange Group, established a joint venture with the state-owned Myanma Economic Bank to establish this stock exchange. The joint venture firm, the Yangon Stock Exchange-Joint Venture Limited had a working capital of US$31 million. The Securities and Exchange Commission selected Kanbawza Bank to be YSX' settlement bank.

== Building history ==
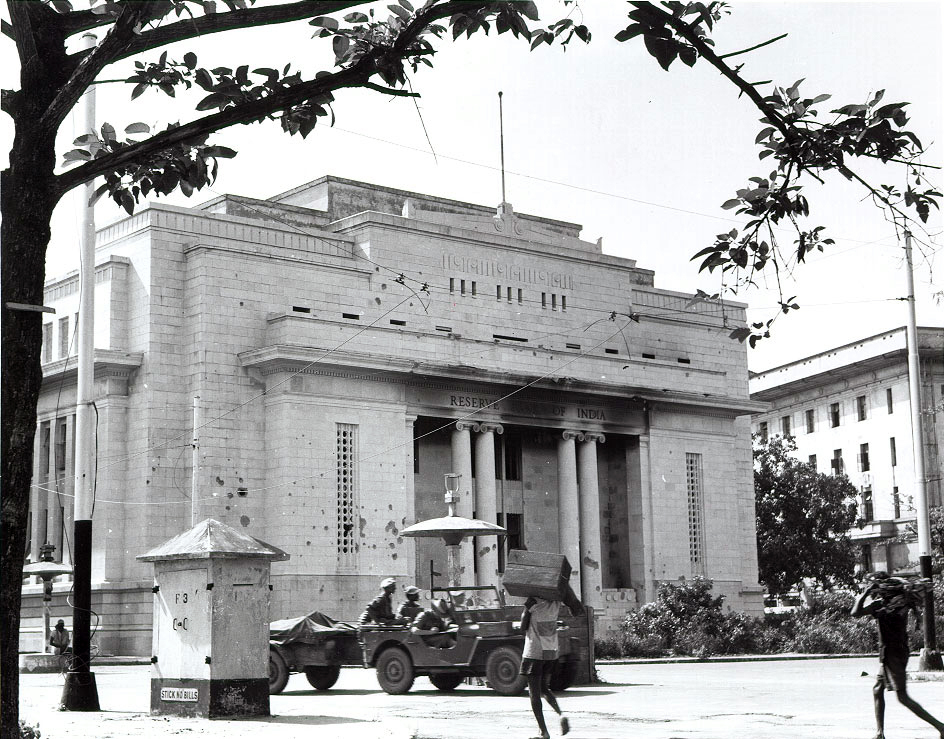
Rangoon branch of the Reserve Bank of India

The YSX building, located on the corner of Sule Pagoda Road and Merchant Street, formerly housed the Central Bank of Myanmar. The neoclassical structure was designed by G Douglas Smart, and opened in 1939, as the Rangon branch of the Reserve Bank of India, and managed British Burma's financial system, even after its separation from British India in 1937.

Following monetary independence from Britain, the building became home to the Union Bank of Burma (ပြည်တောင်စုဘဏ်), and the first Burmese kyats were issued there in July 1952. It remained the site of Myanmar's central bank until 1993, when it became occupied by the military-owned Myawaddy Bank.

== Listed Companies ==
Code	Listing Date	Company name	Industry	Foundation	ISIN
00001	2016-03-25	First Myanmar Investment	Investment Company	1992-07-03	MM0000100006
00002	2016-05-20	Myanmar Thilawa SEZ Holdings Public Limited	Real Estate Development	2013-05-03	MM0000200004
00003	2016-08-26	Myanmar Citizens Bank Ltd	Commercial Banking Industry	1991-10-30	MM0000300002
00004	2017-01-20	First Private Bank Limited	Commercial Banking Industry	1991-09-09	MM0000400000
00005	2018-01-26	TMH Telecom Public	Telecommunications Industry	2007-08-21	MM0000500007
00006	2020-05-28	Ever Flow River Group	logistics	2014-04-10	MM0000600005
00007	2021-06-03	Amata Holding Public Co., Ltd	Hotel Business	2017-06-27	MM0000700003
00008	2023-07-03	Myanmar Agro Exchange Public Co., Ltd	Wholesale Market	2015-09-14	MM0000800000

== See also ==
- List of ASEAN stock exchanges by market capitalization
- Rangoon Stock Exchange
