= Sxc =

Sxc or SXC may refer to:

- Sondalia railway station, West Bengal, India, by Indian Railways station code
- stock.xchng, photo-sharing website
- .sxc, OpenOffice.org spreadsheet file extension
