= Rangoon Stock Exchange =

Stock exchange in Myanmar

- Type: Stock exchange
- Location: Yangon, Myanmar
- Founded: 1930s
- Currency: Burmese rupee Myanma kyat
- No. of listings: 9

The Rangoon Stock Exchange was a secondary over-the-counter (OTC) stock market that operated in Yangon from the 1930s to 1941 and from the late 1950s to the early 1960s. The fledgling exchange, operated by seven European firms, was a secondary OTC market for a few British and American stocks with most of the quotes sourced from Calcutta and Bombay Stock Exchanges. It closed down at the outbreak of World War II in 1941. It was revived in the late 1950s to trade shares of nine public-private joint-venture corporations. But this OTC market too died in the 1960s when all the firms were nationalized by Gen. Ne Win's military government that seized power in 1962.

== Bibliography ==
- Yin Yin Mya (2000). Myat Thein, Maw Than (ed.). Financial Resources for Development in Myanmar: Lessons from Asia (illustrated ed.). Institute of Southeast Asian Studies. ISBN 9789812300706.
