= Philippine Dealing Exchange =

- Type: Stock exchange
- Location: 29th Floor, BDO Equitable Tower, 8751 Paseo de Roxas, Makati, Philippines
- Founded: April 2001
- Owner: Philippine Dealing & Exchange Corp
- Key people: Vicente B. Castillo Chairman and (CEO)
- Currency: Philippine peso (PHP)
- Website: Philippine Dealing & Exchange Corp.

The Philippine Dealing & Exchange Corp. (PDEx) is a dealing exchange for major banks in the Philippines. The primary exchange of the country for all sectors is the Philippine Stock Exchange.

PDEx is licensed by the Securities and Exchange Commission (SEC) as an Exchange under the provisions of the Securities Regulation Code (SRC). It acts as an electronic trading platform for the Philippine peso and the United States Dollars. In this capacity, PDEx provides a centralized & efficient infrastructure for trading securities which ensures price discovery, transparency, and investor protection. In July 2006, SEC formally recognized PDEx as a Self-Regulatory Organization (SRO) in the Inter-Dealer Market and is thus vested with the responsibility of formulating the requisite market rules, undertaking surveillance and enforcing compliance in the inter-dealer market. In November 2007, the SEC expanded the SRO registration of PDEx to cover the Inter-Professional Market, and in February 2008, its SRO authority was expanded to cover its members in all markets within the PDEx Trading Systems.

Trading on the PDEx platform is done through a state-of-the-art trading engine called X-Stream that was developed by NASDAQ OMX. Trading Participants are provided a front-end system (the Fixed Income Trading Workstation, FITW) through which quotes can be entered and/or amended and where transactions are eventually executed. The electronic system displays live bid and offer quotes and publishes transaction data to Trading Participants allowing for price discovery. In addition, real-time fixed income market information is published on subscription basis through the PDEx MarketPage locally, and through PDEx data pages on REUTERS globally.

== PDEX Trading Platforms and Systems ==
PDEx began trading operations in Government Securities in March 2005, with a Negotiated Dealing System for the Inter-Dealer Market. The system was enhanced with the introduction of Straight-Through-Processing (STP) in September 2006. The STP facility generates settlement instructions from trades in the centralized transaction data base in the Trading System and publishes them into a secure website for the Operations Personnel of Trading Participants to reconcile and authorize. Once authorized, the settlement instructions are sent through to the Bureau of the Treasury (BTr), which operates the Delivery-versus-Payment Service for Government Securities with the Bangko Sentral ng Pilipinas (BSP, the central bank). The facility eliminates the need for the Operations Personnel to re-enter trade-related settlement instructions into a separate system.

An Auto-Matching System was also launched in November 2006, to complement the trading of Government Securities on Negotiated Dealing System. This system allows Trading Participants to enter live Bid and Offer Orders anonymously into a Central Order Book. The Central Order Book has a matching engine that generates trades with matching algorithms based on trading limits, price, and time. The Auto-Matching System shall provide the basic structure for the key product offering of trading between and among public participants.

To support the Auto-Matching System, PDEx launched a Market Maker Program with the expressed objective of increasing price liquidity in twelve (12) pre-identified government securities with outstanding size of ₱8.0 billion or higher. Eleven (11) institutions have initially participated in this program all of whom actively trade on PDEx. This incentive program shall be enhanced for Trading Participants that will commit to providing price liquidity into the expanded market for qualified institutions and retail investors.

A significant development has also been the appointment by the Bankers Association of the Philippines of PDEx as the Official Calculation Agent for new Philippine fixed income interest rate benchmarks. Under this engagement, PDEx through its SRO, monitors compliance with timeliness and accuracy standards for price and transaction reporting, further strengthening the interest rate benchmark setting process. Live operations on setting the new PDS Treasury Reference rates commenced on March 19, 2006.

== Governance ==
In July 2006, the Philippine Dealing & Exchange Corp. (PDEx) was granted registration as a Self-Regulatory Organization (SRO) by the Securities & Exchange Commission (SEC) for the Inter-Dealer Market. In November 2007, the SEC expanded the SRO registration of PDEx to cover the Inter-Professional Market.

Under the Securities Regulation Code (Republic Act No. 8799), an SRO is registered as such under the SRC to enforce compliance with provisions of the Code and its rules and regulations, and mandated to make and enforce its own rules. It should enforce fair, ethical and efficient practices in the securities industry.

With this mandate, PDEx has created a comprehensive governance structure that is designed to separate the market governance function of PDEx from its corporate governance structure that sees to the business needs of PDEx as a commercial enterprise.

The Market Governance Board (MGB) is a separate and independent body that is created for the primary purpose of crafting regulation and the Market Compliance and Discipline Committee (MCDC) for the purpose of seeing to the proper observance of market rules and laws.

The MGB is composed of 9 governors, 4 governors representing market interests, the issuers, the dealers, the salesmen, and the investors, 4 governors that are independent and a representative of PDEx as market operator. The membership was designed to achieve a balance of market interests and independence, to ensure that rule measures are not only in accord with market practice and consistent with market interest but also are aligned with the relevant regulatory principles in applicable global practice and standards and the responsibilities of PDEx as an SRO.

The envisioned market structure hopes to establish an SRO that is both a partner with the industry and an enforcer of market rules to participants that have agreed to be bound thereby.

== See also ==
- Philippine Stock Exchange
