= Tokyo Commodity Exchange =

Energy exchange in Tokyo, Japan

Tokyo Commodity Exchange, Inc.
- 東京商品取引所
- TOCOM uses the logo of its parent company, Japan Exchange Group.

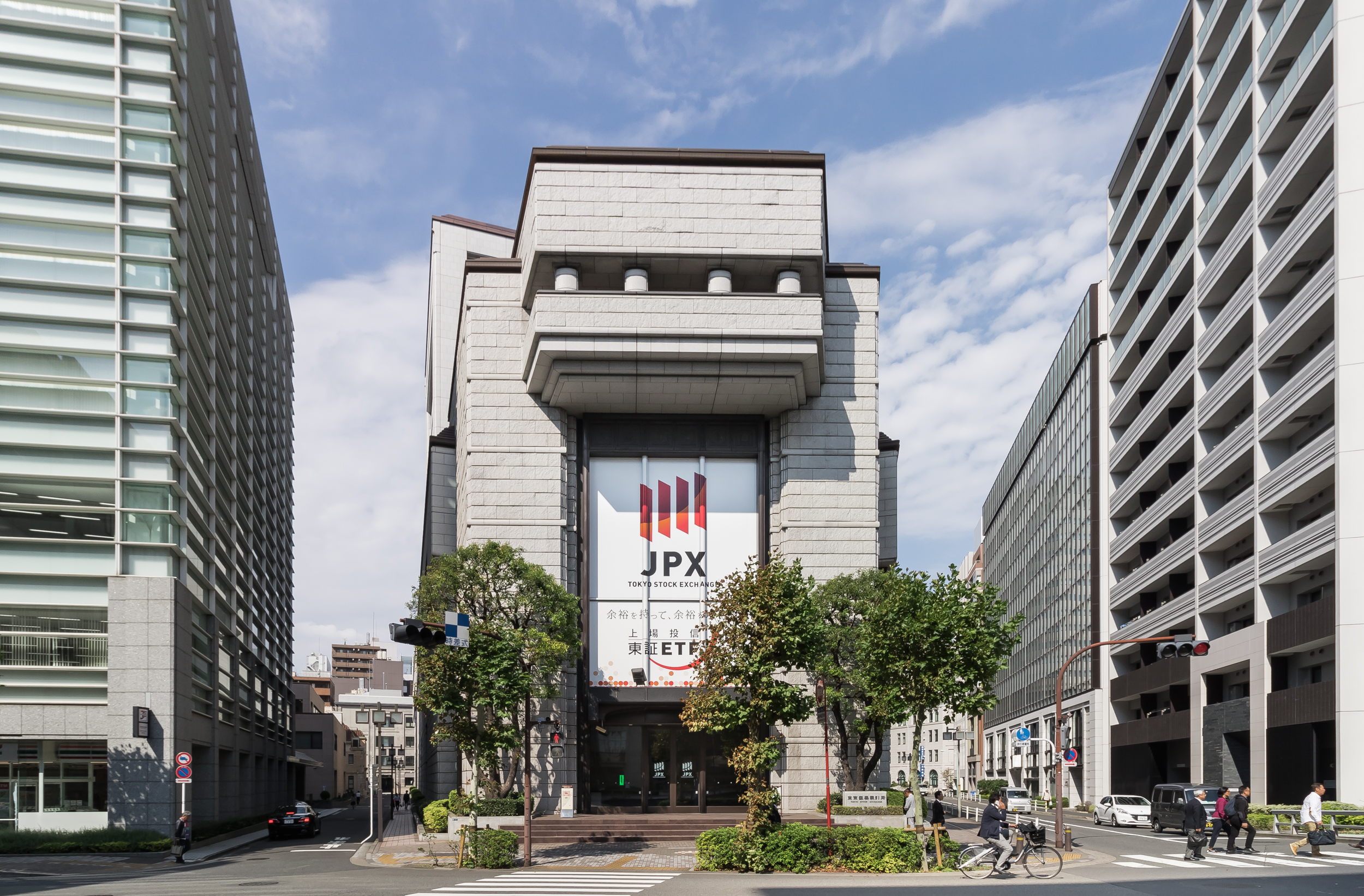
- TOCOM is headquartered in the Tokyo Stock Exchange Building.
- Type: Energy exchange
- Location: Tokyo, Japan
- Coordinates: 35°41′19.3″N 139°46′46.5″E
- Founded: February 1951; 75 years ago (as Tokyo Textile Exchange); November 1984 (as Tokyo Textile Exchange)
- Owner: Japan Exchange Group
- Key people: Takamichi Hamada (President and CEO)
- Currency: JPY
- Commodities: Gasoline; Kerosene; Gas Oil; Crude Oil; Liquefied Natural Gas; Baseload Electricity; Peakload Electricity
- No. of listings: 19
- Website: jpx.co.jp

The Tokyo Commodity Exchange (Japanese: 東京商品取引所, Hepburn: Tōkyō Shōhin Torihikijo), or TOCOM, is an energy exchange in Tokyo, Japan. TOCOM is operated by Tokyo Commodity Exchange, Inc. (Japanese: 株式会社東京商品取引所, Hepburn: Kabushiki Gaisha Tōkyō Shōhin Torihikijo; Corporate Number: 4010001121906), a wholly owned subsidiary of Japan Exchange Group (JPX). Under the Commodity Derivatives Transaction Act of Japan, It is a licensed commodity exchange operator that provides market facilities for trading of commodity derivatives, physical commodities and commodity price index futures.

TOCOM once operated electronic markets for precious metals, oil, rubber and soft commodities. It offered futures and options contracts for precious metals (gold, silver, platinum and palladium); energy (crude oil, gasoline, kerosene and gas oil); natural rubber and agricultural products (soybeans, corn and azuki).

JPX acquired TOCOM in 2019 and transferred these exchange-traded derivatives markets except energy derivatives markets to the Osaka Exchange in 2020, which became Japan's largest and one of Asia's most prominent derivatives exchanges.

Today, TOCOM is the only Japanese exchange that offers energy commodities futures on gasoline, kerosene, gas oil, Dubai Crude oil, liquefied natural gas, baseload electricity, peakload electricity, Chukyo gasoline, and Chukyo kerosene.

== Products ==
TOCOM's Energy Market and Chukyo Oil Market offer the following products:

List of products traded on TOCOM's Energy Market and Chukyo Oil Market
Category	Underlying	Product
Fuel	Gasoline	Gasoline Futures
Fuel	Chukyo Gasoline	Chukyo-Gasoline Futures
Fuel	Kerosene	Kerosene Futures
Fuel	Chukyo Kerosene	Chukyo-Kerosene Futures
Fuel	Gas Oil	Gas Oil Futures
Fuel	Dubai Crude Oil	Platts Dubai Crude Oil Futures
Fuel	Liquefied Natural Gas	LNG (Platts JKM) Futures
Baseload Electricity	East Area Baseload Electricity	East Area Baseload Electricity Futures (Weekly)
Baseload Electricity	East Area Baseload Electricity	East Area Baseload Electricity Futures (Monthly)
Baseload Electricity	East Area Baseload Electricity	East Area Baseload Electricity (Fiscal Year)
Baseload Electricity	West Area Baseload Electricity	West Area Baseload Electricity Futures (Weekly)
Baseload Electricity	West Area Baseload Electricity	West Area Baseload Electricity Futures (Monthly)
Baseload Electricity	West Area Baseload Electricity	West Area Baseload Electricity (Fiscal Year)
Peakload Electricity	East Area Peakload Electricity	East Area Peakload Electricity Futures (Weekly)
Peakload Electricity	East Area Peakload Electricity	East Area Peakload Electricity Futures (Monthly)
Peakload Electricity	East Area Peakload Electricity	East Area Peakload Electricity (Fiscal Year)
Peakload Electricity	West Area Peakload Electricity	West Area Peakload Electricity Futures (Weekly)
Peakload Electricity	West Area Peakload Electricity	West Area Peakload Electricity Futures (Monthly)
Peakload Electricity	West Area Peakload Electricity	West Area Peakload Electricity (Fiscal Year)

== History ==
Logo prior to JPX acquisition in 2019

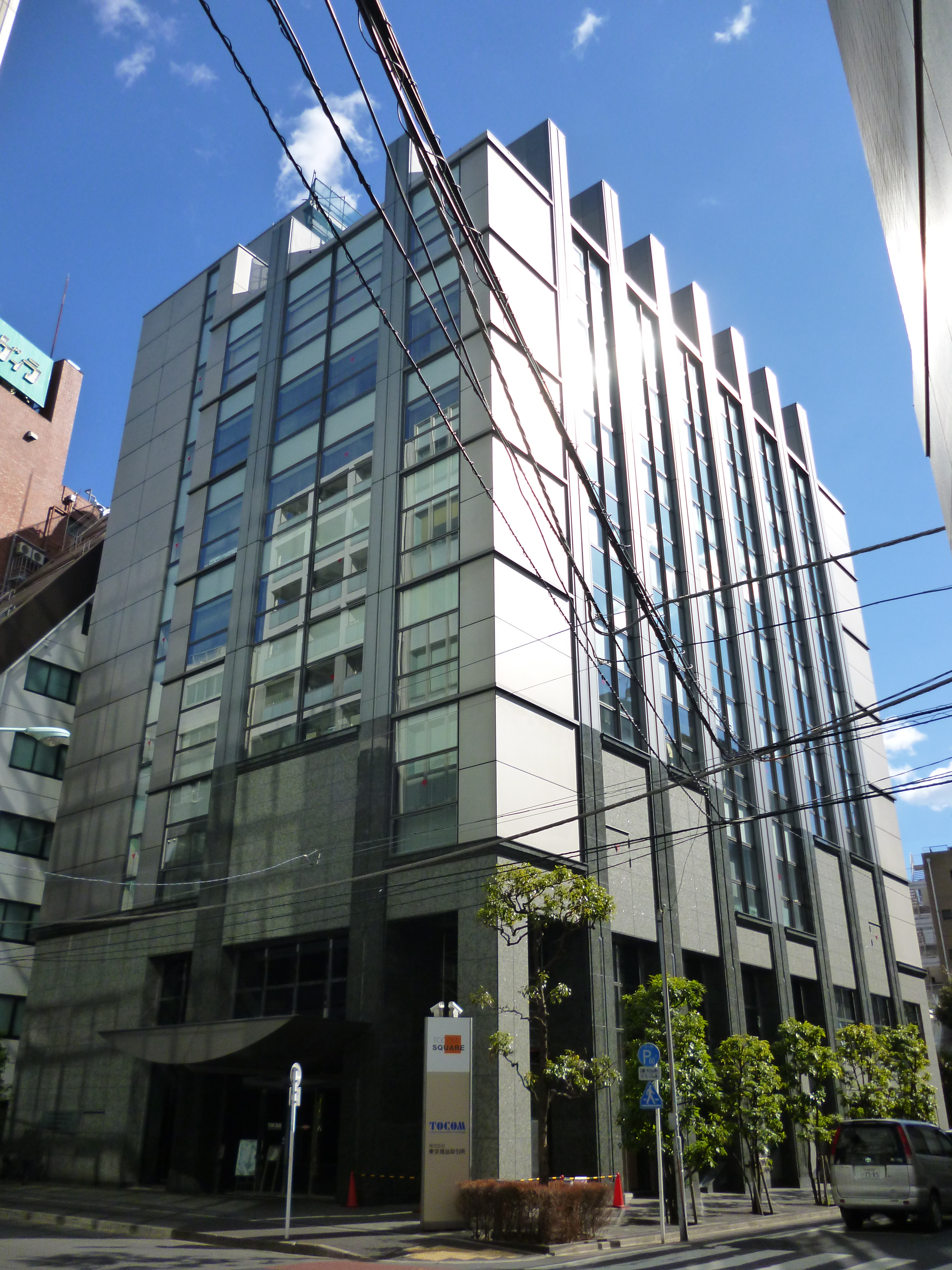
The Tokyo Commodity Exchange Horidome Building was TOCOM's former head office from 1999 to 2020.

TOCOM was established in 1984 with the merger of the Tokyo Textile Exchange, founded in 1951, the Tokyo Rubber Exchange, and the Tokyo Gold Exchange. The exchange became a for-profit shareholder-owned company in 2008.

It launched the current trading platform based on the Nasdaq OMX technology in 2009. TOCOM will use Japan Exchange Group's new derivatives trading platform, Next J-Gate, from September 2016.

In 2019 TOCOM was acquired by JPX.

The retail electricity market in Japan was fully liberalized in April 2016, followed by a series of reforms in the electricity sector in Japan, such as the revision of the rules on power grids and the establishment of a baseload electricity market of the Japan Electric Power Exchange (JEPX). Against this background, the size of the JEPX wholesale electricity market expanded rapidly to reach approximately one-third of the total electricity demand in Japan. As most of the power companies that newly entered the retail power market rely on JEPX for procurement, the importance of JEPX increased and the need to hedge price volatility risk rose.

In September 2019, to meet such demands, TOCOM listed four electricity futures contracts on a trial basis: East Area Baseload Electricity, West Area Baseload Electricity, East Area Peakload Electricity and West Area Peakload Electricity.

In 2020, to centralize commodity trading and clearing operations, its non-energy futures markets were transferred to the Osaka Exchange and put under the management of Japan Securities Clearing Corporation (JSCC), which absorbed Japan Commodity Clearing House Co., Ltd. (JCCH), a subsidiary of TOCOM. This left TOCOM with only fuel and electricity futures trading.

On 5 August 2020, TOCOM's head office relocated from the Tokyo Commodity Exchange Horidome Building in the Nihonbashi Horidomechō district to the Tokyo Stock Exchange Building in Tokyo's financial district, Nihonbashi Kabutochō.

On 4 April 2022, TOCOM listed LNG (Platts JKM) futures contracts on a trial basis and changed the listing status of the electricity futures from trial listing to permanent listing. This will improve the market convenience of TOCOM as a “Consolidated Energy Derivatives Exchange” where one can trade the electricity futures and the fuel futures in one-stop trading environment, enabling fuel price risk management for gas-fired power plants.

On 19 January 2023, JPX signed a memorandum of understanding (MOU) with JEPX so that TOCOM's electricity futures market and JEPX's electricity spot market could work together and share information to increase the convenience and competitiveness of the Japanese power market. In 2022, fluctuations in electricity prices intensified due to several factors, such as rising fuel prices caused by the Russian invasion of Ukraine and concerns about power supply shortages in the summer and winter. Under these circumstances, the role of these markets to ensure stable power supply and hedge price fluctuation risks became even more important.

On 18 March 2024, TOCOM began trading of weekly electricity futures contracts in order to meet the need for hedging during periods of large temporary fluctuations in electricity demand, such as Golden Week and Obon.

On 26 May 2025, TOCOM launched fiscal year electricity futures trading in order to meet the need for hedging transactions during the Japanese fiscal year from April to March of the following year. Long-term bilateral contracts under which Japanese power generation companies and electricity retailers (ja:小売電気事業者) buy and sell electricity are generally conducted on a fiscal year basis.
