= Osaka Dojima Exchange =

Japanese corporation

Osaka Dojima Exchange, Inc.
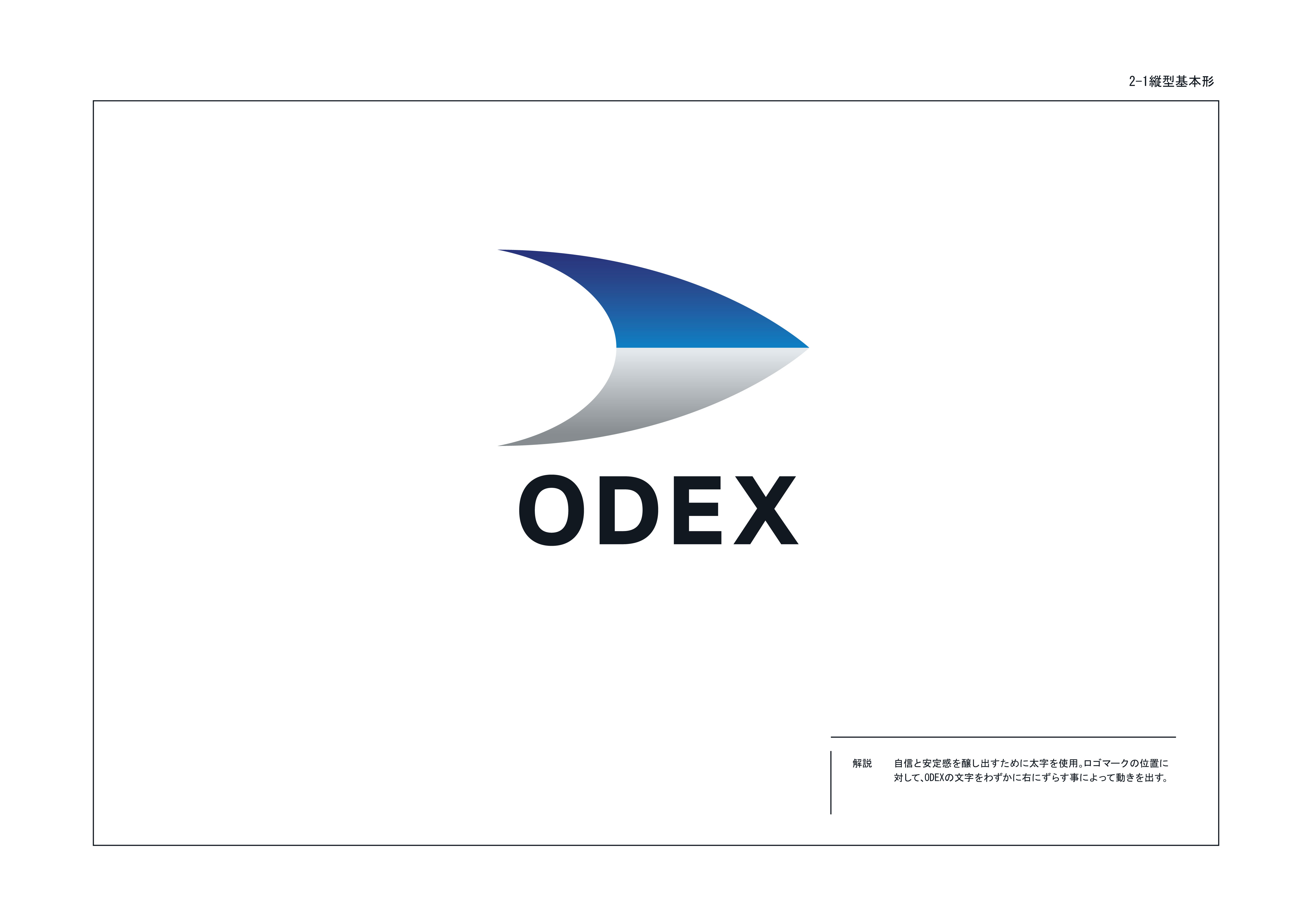
- Company type: Public
- Industry: Commodity futures exchanges
- Founded: October 6, 1952
- Headquarters: Osaka, Japan
- Products: Commodity futures
- Website: www.odex.co.jp/en

Osaka Dojima Exchange, Inc. (ODEX) is a Japanese corporation that operates a listed derivatives exchange that follows the tradition of the Osaka Dojima Rice Exchange of the Edo period. Formerly a "Mutually Owned Commodity Exchange" under the Commodity Futures Act, the company was reorganized as a joint stock company on April 1, 2021, and became a "Stock Company Operated Commodity Exchange"" under the same law.

== History ==
The Osaka Grain Exchange (the parent of this exchange) was established in Awaza, Nishi-ku, Osaka City, in the tradition of the former Osaka Dojima Rice Exchange, led by Osaka merchants of rice, miscellaneous grains, etc. Osaka's Dojima Exchange takes pride in being the birthplace of futures trading.

As of August 1, 2005, it was organized by 68 members in the agricultural products market, 52 in the agricultural products and feed index market, 46 in the marine products market, 36 in the sugar market, and 18 in the cocoon yarn market. Members included both general members and commissioned members.

In recent years, there has been a concentration of trading on the Osaka Exchange, a member of the Japan Exchange Group (JPX), where similar commodities are listed. The gap between the two exchanges, in terms of traded volume, is large. The current ODEX, like the JPX-affiliated Tokyo Commodity Exchange, is a "Commodity Exchange Corporation" under the Commodity Futures Trading Law, while the Osaka Exchange, Japan's first "Comprehensive Exchange," is a "Financial Instruments Exchange Corporation" under the Financial Instruments and Exchange Law, and thus has a different legal basis.

At the 35th Extraordinary General Meeting (held on March 30, 2012), the introduction of a next-generation trading system was approved, and an order was placed with Intertrade for the "order matching system" and NTT Communications for the clearing system. This next generation trading system added a breadth function to the existing system, further expanding the zaraba portion of the system.

In September 2012, trading was launched with the price-matching session trading, known as itayose, and in October 2018, the system was converted to continuous trading with price and time prioritzation, known as zaraba trading.

In February 2013, the corporate name was changed to "Osaka Dojima Commodity Exchange".

On October 12, 2020, the "Management Reform Council" (Chairman: Professor Takero Doi, Keio University), an expert panel for management restructuring, compiled a final recommendation calling for a "comprehensive exchange" that would handle a wide range of agricultural commodity futures, industrial goods futures, and financial futures in addition to cash-trading and futures on rice. The proposal presented a vision for the future that called for the ODEX to become a competitor to the JPX as a second comprehensive exchange group. The Management Reform Council requested the following management reforms from the management.

The company became a joint stock company by January 2021, aiming to enhance its capital through a capital increase and at the same time operate an exchange with good governance and management efficiency. While calling for investment from rice-related parties and domestic and foreign financial institutions, the management team was renewed. The exchange reviewed its product design, including the introduction of smaller contract and tick sizes, and aimed to expand trading volume as a commodities exchange under the jurisdiction of the Ministry of Agriculture, Forestry and Fisheries, for the time being. The SBI Group will provides liquidity and other support. Even in the event that the main listing of rice futures is not approved and the test listing is terminated, the company will aim to list rice futures again after improving the system.

In April 2021, the company was reorganized into a joint-stock corporation and became "Osaka Dojima Commodity Exchange, Inc." after receiving a two billion yen investment from eight companies, including SBI Holdings, Japannext Securities, Optiver, Okayasu Shoji, and Yutaka Trusty Securities. As a result, SBI Holdings and its subsidiary JapanNext Securities together hold over 33% of the voting rights, making it an SBI-affiliated exchange.

On August 10, 2021, the corporate name became "Dojima Exchange Co" (堂島取引所). This is to clarify its policy of becoming a comprehensive exchange that handles financial futures and options as well as commodity futures and options. Osaka" was also removed from the Japanese name, but retained in the English company name.

On January 16, 2023, the opening of a futures market for precious metals was approved by the government, and futures trading in gold, silver, and platinum began on March 27, 2023.

On August 13, 2024, ODEX listed Dojima Rice Average futures, Japan's first-ever rice futures price index index, linked to the Dojima Rice Average, which is published on the top page of the ODEX homepage on the last business day of each month.

== Corporate information ==
Company name	Osaka Dojima Exchange, Inc. (ODEX)
Type of company	Joint stock company
President and CEO	Wataru Ariga
Established	October 6, 1952
Capital	1,089 million yen
Issued shares	2,518,566 shares Number of Shares of each type: Common: 1,338,566 shares Nonvoting: 1,180,000 shares
Number of voting rights of the total Shareholders	1,338,566
Business content	Establish and provide an exchange market for futures trading to ensure market fairness
Number of employees	28 (as of Oct 18, 2023)
Head office	1-10-14 Awaza Nishi-ku, Osaka City Osaka, Japan 550-0011 Access: 5-minute walk from Exit 23 of Hommachi Station on the Osaka Metro Yotsubashi Line, Chuo Line, and Midosuji Line.ACCESS MAP
Tokyo branch office	Toranomon No.2 Waiko Bldg. 8FL Toranomon 5-2-6 Minato-ku, Tokyo, Japan 105-0001 Access: 1-minute walk from Exit 2 of Kamiyacho Station on the Tokyo Metro Hibiya Line ACCESS MAP

== Birthplace of futures trading ==
=== Origin in the mid-Edo period ===
In the Edo Period, feudal domains collected rice as a tax. They sent the rice to Osaka and Edo (Tokyo) for the purpose of cashing in, except for the amount used for food and stockpiling. At that time, many of the Kurayashiki (warehouses) were concentrated in Osaka and the rice stored there was sold to rice brokers through auctions. Securities called “Rice bills”, which were issued in exchange for the rice, were traded actively. It can be said that rice was securitized. These rice bills also covered unharvested rice. And trading participants could trade futures by contract for difference (CFD) simply by preparing a margin called “shikigin”.

In 1730, a spot market to trade rice bills and a rice futures market located in the Dojima area of Osaka（Dojima Rice Exchange）were authorized by the Edo shogunate. Dojima was equipped with a membership system and clearing functions. Rice prices formed here were transferred to the major cities by couriers. The rules, customs, and functions in Dojima formed the basis of those now in place at modern exchanges. The CBOT (Chicago Board of Trade), which is the oldest commodity exchange in the United States, and the predominant futures market in the world, is said to have been developed based on the Osaka Dojima market.

In that period of time rice could be regarded as a main financial asset of the Japanese people. The DNA of Dojima Rice Exchange (which traded the rice as a futures contract) is being passed down to ODEX, which is currently aiming to develop a wide range of derivative financial products as a comprehensive exchange.

Mark D. West, in his paper entitled, "Private Ordering at the World's First Futures Exchange", laid out eight factors the Dojima Exchange had that are considered to be inherent in futures markets, as identified by Roberta Romano. As such the Dojima exchange is often characterized as the world's first organized futures exchange.

- Standardized terms for the trading contracts, including the trading unit, minimum price movements (aka tick size), eligibility of deliverable goods, delivery destination, contract duration, last trade date, establish of a "book" transaction system for recording trades, and a cash settlement system.
- Futures contracts transferability, the ability to close out a position by placing an opposite trade with another market participant, without having to exchange the underlining product.
- Auction trading, like that used in "pit trading" such as the infamous Chicago market pits, was a method of trade, negating the need for specialists or intermediaries to make trades.
- Price limits in the form of a unique "firebox system" which exchange operators used to determine the closing time and subsequently the closing price, and which, internally or inadvertently, discouraged market manipulation.
- Price discovery, with the futures market opening two hours before the spot market, and with prices immediately transmitted to Edo (Tokyo), using flag signals, smoke signals, and carrier pigeons.
- Cash settlement as most trades were cash settled, a process made possible by the book transaction system.
- Implementation of a clearinghouse system whereby the clearinghouses served as transaction intermediaries between trading counterparties. The clearinghouses would guarantee both sides of a transaction, reducing the risk of cost and risk of market transactions.
- Margination and daily settlement requirements were established by the clearinghouses to mitigate risk. Participants were required to book transactions at the end of the day and pay margin against open positions.

== Vision ==
Dojima Exchange aims to become a "comprehensive exchange that ranks among the world's leading exchanges" with the following three pillars.

Three Pillars of ODEX's Vision
Customer-Oriented	To be convenient to trade and customer driven – providing market infrastructure that can be easily and safely accessed, responding to the hedging requirements of investors and businesses, as well as delivering products attractive to individual investors.
Global - a Cross-border Hub Market in Asia	To be a cross-border, Asia-based, global hub market - providing arbitrage opportunities through collaboration with overseas institutional investors and overseas exchanges.
Innovative	To create new markets to trade alongside the conventional actively traded derivatives, including precious metals and agricultural products, ESG-related resources, stock indexes, foreign exchange, and crypto asset derivatives.

== ODEX trading participants ==
Those who can trade directly on the commodity market operated by the Dojima Exchange are called trading participants. Trading participants are broadly classified into market trading participants and fiduciary trading participants. Those who are not trading participants trade through fiduciary trading participants.

List of fiduciary trading participants

Fiduciary trading participants trade on their own account as well as offer broker services

List of trading participants (as of 2023.7.1)
Participants	AG	SUG	PM
Okachi & Co., Ltd.	○	○	○
Okayasu Shoji Co., Ltd.	○	○	○
Comtex Ltd.	○		○
Sunward Trading Inc.	○	○	○
Nissan Securities Co., Ltd.	○		○
Hoxsin Bussan Co., Ltd.	○		○
Yutaka Trusty Securities Co., Ltd.	○	○	○
SBI Securities Co., Ltd.	○		○

List of marketplace participants

Marketplace participants only trade on their own account; as of July 1, 2023, market participants are as follows:

ASTEM Co., Ltd.	KANEZEN Co., Ltd.	Japan Rice Millers and Distributors Cooperaive	Meiji Food Materia Co., Ltd.
APRE Co., Ltd	KANETSU SHOJI Co., Ltd.	Senda Mizuho Limited	Mori Planning Co., Ltd.
ITAMI SANGYO Co., Ltd.	KANEMASU SHOUTEN Co., Ltd.	TSUDA BUSSAN Co., Ltd.	YAMASAN Ltd.
Intertrade Healthcare Co., Ltd.	KISHIWADA SHOKURYO Co., Ltd.	Mitsui DM Sugar Co., Ltd.	YAMATANE CORPORATION
AH Investment Pte. Ltd．	KITOKU SHINRYO Co., Ltd.	Nippon Beet Sugar Manufacturing Co., Ltd.	YOSHINO DENKA KOGYO, Inc.
AH Products Co., Ltd	近畿食糧株式会社	Nihon Material Co., Ltd.	BuySell Technologies Co., Ltd.
Sunward Asset trading Co. Ltd	Crystal Rice Co., Ltd.	公益社団法人日本べんとう振興協会	SBI Neo Trade Securities Co., Ltd.
Ohnishi Shoji Co., Ltd.	SHINMEI Co., Ltd.	MURASE Co., Ltd.	

== Listed futures ==
Precious metals

The following three commodities are currently being test-listed, with a three-year time frame, with the aim of increasing trading and making it a permanent market. Smaller trading contract and tick sizes and night-session trading is expected to attract domestic and foreign trading participants.

1. Gold 2. Silver 3. Platinum

Agricultural products

1. Red Beans 2. Raw Sugar 3. U.S. Soybeans 4. Yellow Corn 50 5. Niigata Koshi EXW (to be delisted on Nov 20, 2023)

Index products

Dojima Rice Average® (Japanese Rice Futures Price Index)

== Future vision ==
In October 2020, in its final recommendation, the "Management Reform Council" pointed out that "the futures market is a derivative market that can only exist with a solid cash market," and called for the Dojima Exchange to operate both a cash exchange and a futures exchange. Furthermore, it called for the realization of "a vision of the future" that has enough presence to compete with the Japan Exchange Group, which has become a comprehensive exchange, rather than seeking measures to remain a single local exchange." The merger of the Tokyo Stock Exchange, Osaka Securities Exchange, Tokyo Commodity Exchange, and Japan Securities Clearing Corporation into the Japan Exchange Group (JPX) has resulted in the JPX having a near monopoly over the Japanese financial market, with no strong competitors. Mr. Jitsuo Tatara, Chairman of The Commodity Futures Association of Japan (as well as Chairman of Yutaka Trusty Securities), stated that if Dojima Exchange becomes a comprehensive exchange group that can compete with the JPX, it will improve the competitiveness of both exchanges through competition and lead to better services for investors. In addition, having two exchanges handling the same listed stocks will provide investors with the opportunity to earn revenue through arbitrage trading.

The Management Reform Council also recommending the following:

Establishment of an exchange holding company

Establish a financial instruments exchange holding company under the Financial Instruments and Exchange Act, with the exchange holding company owning the cash equity exchange, the futures exchanges, and the central clearing house for clearing operations for both exchanges. The Dojima Exchange group of companies would become a comprehensive exchange group and establish a business structure that can compete with the JPX.

Establishment of Physical exchanges

- Operate a wholesale and consumer market for rice through an electronic trading platform
- Develop price indexes for large-cap, medium-cap, and low-cap shares which are actively traded in Japan
- Attract major stakeholders, including city banks, regional banks, online banks, insurance companies, domestic and foreign exchanges, securities companies, online securities companies, commodity futures traders, general trading companies, local governments, newspapers, news agencies, producers and producers' organizations, collectors, rice sales companies, major supermarkets, and similar.

Establishment of futures exchanges

- Create indexes refleting the price of rice grains and exported rice in the cash market and compose rice futures indices comparable to stock index futures to attract funds. Make this information available to the futures market.
- Offer yen-denominated commodities listed on overseas exchanges such as the Chicago Mercantile Exchange (CME).
- In addition to agricultural futures such as rice, soybeans, and corn, which are under the jurisdiction of the Ministry of Agriculture, Forestry, and Fisheries, list weather derivatives, which are currently not listed in Japan.
- List resource futures such as gold, crude oil, and natural gas under the jurisdiction of the Ministry of Economy, Trade and Industry (In fact, futures on gold, silver, and platinum were listed in March 2023)
- List foreign stock index futures, foreign exchange futures, crypto asset futures, and individual stock futures under the jurisdiction of the FSA. As for foreign stock index futures, the final proposal of the "Management Reform Council" states that the "U.S. Stock Index 500," "U.S. Stock Index 30," and "German Stock Index," and representative indices such as the U.S. S&P 500, Dow Jones Industrial Average 30, and German Stock Indexes are within scope[5][21].
- Handle options trading as well as futures trading.

Central clearing organization of The Dojima Exchange

While Dojima Exchange competes with the nearby Osaka Exchange for several commodities (corn, soybeans, red beans, gold, silver, and platinum), it outsources its clearing operations to the Japan Securities Clearing Corporation (JSCC), a subsidiary of the JPX, and is dependent on the clearing infrastructure provided by the JPX. The Japan Commodity Clearing House (JCCH), which was a subsidiary of the Tokyo Commodity Exchange (TOCOM), had been providing clearing services for TOCOM and Dojima Exchanges; however, in July 2020, the precious metals market (physical gold trading not being subject to transfer), rubber market, and agricultural products and sugar (which was delisted), the JCCH was merged into the JSCC. As a result of this merger, JSCC took over the clearing operations for listed commodity derivatives transactions of the Osaka Exchange, the Tokyo Commodity Exchange, and Dojima Exchange. Clearing fees paid to JSCC by the trading participants of each exchange are one of the JPX's revenue sources.To compete with the JPX, Dojima Exchange should have its own central clearing house, allowing for it to earn the clearing-related revenues.

== Contribution to the Osaka International Financial City Concept ==
Osaka Prefecture and Osaka City are promoting The Osaka International Financial City Concept to drive the growth of the Japanese economy by attracting investment from around the world to Osaka and creating business opportunities, seizing the opportunity presented by the 2025 Osaka-Kansai Expo to be held on Yumeshima and the planned integrated resort (IR). As a promoting organization, the "International Financial City OSAKA Promotion Committee" was established in March 2021, consisting of the government, the business community, and various organizations. This committee includes Osaka Exchange, Dojima Exchange, SBI Holdings, Japannext Securities, and others.

In order to capture the growth of derivatives trading, the Osaka International Financial City Concept aims to make Osaka a major hub for the derivatives market in Asia. However, in terms of derivatives market turnover (in 2021), Japan Exchange Group, which operates Osaka Exchange and Tokyo Commodity Exchange, ranked 19th in the world with only 330 million units, well below that of several exchanges in the region, including the NSE, ZCE, SHFE, Dalian, Korea, and BSE.

Trading volume on global derivatives exchanges has doubled over the past 10 years, increasing from 22.4 billion contracts in 2010 to 46.7 billion contracts in 2020 [20]. In addition to futures and options on stock indices, individual securities, interest rates, and currencies, trading related to commodities (commodities) such as energy, precious and non-precious metals, and agricultural products has also increased. The revitalization of derivatives trading, especially commodity-related trading, is a major challenge for Japan's financial markets.

Yoshitaka Kitao, president of SBI Holdings, has a vision to attract "cross-border" international financial centers to Osaka and Kobe, which are different from the "capital function type" Tokyo, and has positioned Dojima Exchange as the core of such centers. Dojima Exchange is expected to play a role in the Osaka International Financial City Concept, together with Osaka Exchange, Japan's largest derivatives exchange for securities, financial and commodity derivatives, SBI's private trading system (PTS), and Osaka Digital Exchange.

== History ==
Source: In the Mid-17th century, rice wholesaler Yodoya opened Yodoya Rice Market at the storefront on the south side of Osaka Yodoya Bridge.

Around 1697, Yodoya Rice Market moved to Dojima, which is on the opposite bank of Kitahama, and became the Dojima Rice Exchange.

In 1730, under the reign of Yoshimune Tokugawa, the 8th Shogun of Edo Shogunate, the Dojima Rice Exchange - the world's first futures trading market - was officially licensed by Ohoka Tadasuke.

In 1869, the Meiji government abolished Dojima Rice Exchange, which it deemed to be a cause of soaring rice prices.

In 1871, the revival of Dojima Rice Exchange was officially permitted.

In 1873, the Dojima Rice Exchange merged with the Oil Exchange to form Dojima Rice and Oil Exchange (The name returned to Dojima Rice Exchange after that due to the abolishment of the Oil Exchange).

In 1876, the Dojima Rice Exchange became Osaka Dojima Rice Exchange by enacting the Rice Chamber of Commerce Regulations.

In 1893, the Osaka Dojima Rice Exchange was reorganized into the Osaka Dojima Rice Exchange Co., Ltd. due to the enactment of the Exchange Law.

In 1939, the Osaka Dojima Rice Exchange was abolished by the enforcement of the Rice Distribution Control Law.

In 1950, the Japan Commodity Exchange Act was enacted.

In 1951, the Kobe Commodity Exchange opened.

In 1952, the Osaka Grain Exchange was established (former parent of the current Dojima Exchange Co.). The Osaka Sugar Exchange and Kobe Grain Exchange also opened.

In 1953, the Kanmon Grain Exchange opened.

In 1991, the Osaka Sugar Exchange introduced system trading.

In 1992, the Osaka Grain Exchange introduced system trading.

In 1993, the Osaka Grain Exchange, Osaka Sugar Exchange, and Kobe Grain Commodities Exchange mergerd to form the Kansai Agricultural Commodities Exchange.

In 1997, the Kansai Agricultural Commodity Exchange was merged with the Kobe Raw Silk Exchange and renamed Kansai Commodity Exchange.

In 2006, the Kansai Commodity Exchange merged with the Fukuoka Commodities Exchange.

In 2011, the Ministry of Agriculture, Forestry, and Fisheries (MAFF) approved the trial listing of rice futures, and for the first time in 72 years, the rice market was revived and trading recommenced.

In 2013, the Kansai Commodity Exchange was renamed the Osaka Dojima Commodity Exchange by taking the opportunity of accepting the rice market of the Tokyo Grain Exchange.

In April 2021, the organizational conversion from a Member Commodity Exchange to an Incorporated Commodity Exchange was implemented and the name was changed to the Osaka Dojima Commodity Exchange, Inc.

In August 2021, the Osaka Dojima Commodity Exchange, Inc. was renamed Osaka Dojima Exchange, Inc. aka ODEX.

In March 2023, ODEX launched a new precious metals market featuring gold, silver, and platinum rolling spot futures contracts. Simultaneously, night session (T+1) trading began.

In August 2024, ODEX launched Dojima Rice Average® Futures.

== Rice futures trading ==
Rice futures were listed, on a trial basis, from August 2011 to August 2021. The rice futures market has not been able to take off in recent years. In recent years, the demand for rice has seen a steady decline in Japan as the Japanese diet has diversified, sometimes resulting in a supply/demand imbalance. Since the use of futures trading was expected to help farmers diversify their sales outlets and make price formation more transparent, leading to the strengthening of farmers' management capabilities, "rice futures" were experimentally listed on the Tokyo Grain Exchange and the Kansai Commodity Exchange in August 2011. Since the dissolution of the "National Rice Trading and Price Formation Center" (Rice Price Center) at the end of March of that year, there were no price indices for physical trading, and it was hoped that a price index would replace it. After the liberalization of rice distribution in 2004 due to a major revision of the food control system the benefits of listing for sellers, such as collecting societies, and the benefits of procurement for buyers, such as rice wholesalers, were no longer perceived, and the sharp decline in the volume of transactions through the Rice Price Center led to its dissolution.

On February 12, 2013, the Kansai Commodity Exchange changed its name to the "Osaka Dojima Commodity Exchange" and the Tokyo Grain Exchange closed its doors, making the Osaka Dojima Commodity Exchange the only market handling rice futures contracts. The standard commodity for cash settlement was Koshihikari rice produced in Ibaraki, Tochigi, and Chiba prefectures for Tokyo Rice, which was transferred from the Tokyo Grain Exchange, and Koshihikari rice produced in Ishikawa and Fukui prefectures for Osaka Rice.

Afterwards, the Osaka Dojima Commodity Exchange strengthened its management base with investments from SBI Holdings, Japannext Securities, and others. The Osaka Dojima Commodity Exchange repeated the two-year trial listing period four times with the goal of a permanent listing of rice futures. The Ministry of Agriculture, Forestry, and Fisheries had previously proposed two criteria for approval of the main listing: whether sufficient trading volume could be expected and whether the listing was appropriate to facilitate rice production and distribution. The Dojima Exchange focused its sales efforts on increasing trading volume, and trading volume in FY2020 tripled compared to the previous test listing period (August 2005 to August 2007), reaching a record high. Rice futures trading became more active and trading prices were on the rise. The Dojima Exchange, having determined that the criteria for approval could be met, applied for the main listing.

Denial of main listing and delisting of rice futures (August 2021-June 2022)

However, in August 2021, the Ministry of Agriculture, Forestry and Fisheries decided not to approve the main listing of rice futures. It cited a lack of sufficient increase in participation by producers and distributors as the reason for the non-approval, but in a meeting with the Dojima Exchange prior to the application, it was contended that the MAFF did not point out anything about the number of participants in the trade. Therefore, the criteria for approval was seen by some as arbitrary, Rice futures, which were revived in 2011 after 72 years, were to disappear again after only 10 years.

It was asserted that the decision not to approve the listing was influenced by the fact that the JA Group, which controls 40% of rice distribution in Japan, was negative about participating in rice futures trading. If the listing of rice futures were approved, the price of rice would be determined in the transparent futures market, and the JA Group was concerned that the futures market would take control of the rice price, which it had previously determined through relative transactions.

According to an NHK interview, a senior official at the Ministry of Agriculture, Forestry, and Fisheries (MAFF) said that the ministry had been pursuing rice policy based on the philosophy that "consumers are important" and "prices should be determined by the market" out of a reflection that the government had set rice prices for a long time after the war, causing rigidity in the agricultural industry. According to the official, the ministry was moving toward allowing this listing in June 2021, but was unable to persuade the LDP because of opposition such as "government officials talking on their own" .

Meanwhile, regarding this decision by the Ministry of Agriculture, Forestry and Fisheries, Yoshitaka Kitao, president of SBI Holdings, told reporters on August 3, 2021, "Dojima is the birthplace of rice futures trading, and Osaka must not lose this. To deny this is to be 'ignorant,' ignorant of the economy, and ignorant of the world." He strongly criticized the response of the Ministry of Agriculture, Forestry, and Fisheries, the LDP Agriculture and Forestry Subcommittee, and others.

At a press conference on August 10, 2021, Agriculture Minister Kotaro Nogami cited as reasons for the disapproval the fact that the number of parties participating in the trade had remained unchanged, that the parties' intention to use the trade was declining, and that 90% of the trade was biased toward Niigata Koshihikari. On August 4, in response to a request from the LDP's Agriculture, Forestry, and Food Strategy Research Committee and the Agriculture and Forestry Subcommittee that the Ministry of Agriculture, Forestry, and Fisheries establish a study group to discuss the creation of a physical rice market by the end of FY2021, the Ministry announced that a study group of concerned parties, including JA Group, would discuss the physical market and proceed to design a system It was clarified.

On June 20, 2022, main traded issues such as Niigata Koshihikari and Akita Komachi were delisted; by November 20, 2023 (the delivery date of Niigata Koshihikari EXW), trading for export rice will take place, but no trading results were recorded, effectively ending rice futures.

Masashi Sato, president of Niigata Yuki, a large-scale production corporation in Niigata Prefecture that had been participating in rice futures trading, said, "Once the new means of distribution, futures trading, took root, it had the potential to change the winds for agriculture as a whole. By being aware of the market, farmers who had previously relied on JA may have had a chance to develop a sense of 'management.'" The delisting was regretted. A rice wholesaler said that the difficulty in using the product, such as the bias in trading toward Niigata Koshihikari, should have been corrected after the main listing.

Hajime Kobayashi, President of JA Oogata (Oogata Village, Akita Prefecture), who has been participating in rice futures trading for 10 years, points out the usefulness of futures, which allow producers to diversify their sales outlets and avoid the risk of falling prices, based on his experience working on corn farms in the US for two years after graduating from college. In the U.S., risk aversion using futures was so well-established that they could not borrow money from the bank unless they sold their corn through futures contract. Many growers order the next year's seed and plant the following spring without knowing how much rice will sell for in the fall of the harvest season, and the inability to foresee profitability is a business risk. If the future sale price can be determined through futures trading, income can be fixed and the risk of incurring losses due to price declines can be avoided. The level of rice traded on the Dojima Exchange is less than 1% of the total amount of rice in circulation, and "almost zero from an overall perspective" (Ministry of Agriculture, Forestry and Fisheries). Mr. Kobayashi once directly appealed to the chairman of Zenchu and other senior officials to utilize futures trading, but they did not listen to him and were indifferent to his appeal.

Kazuhito Yamashita, an MAFF alumnus and senior researcher at the Canon Institute for Global Studies, stated that the essence of the current issue is the divergence of opinions on who should take the lead in price formation[38]. JAs, who want to control the volume of distribution and maintain rice prices and sales commissions at as high a level as possible, cannot accept a futures market where prices are formed independently in a way they cannot control. For producers, rice futures contracts are like an insurance policy, which avoids the risk of a "poor harvest" due to a price collapse caused by a bumper crop. It is the unspecified investors and speculators who take on the risk of price fluctuations on behalf of the producers, who are looking for profit margins. As for why more producers do not participate in the futures market, they cite the fact that agricultural cooperatives adjust the price of rice and that there is a generous insurance-like system by the government to compensate producers for lost revenue. However, because taxpayer funds are used for this system, taxpayers are forced to bear the risk that would be assumed by investors and speculators if there were a futures market, and taxpayers as well as producers are disadvantaged, he points out.

Establishment of Precious Metals Market and Efforts to Re-list Rice Futures (after June 2022)

President Kazuhiro Nakatsuka resigned at the general shareholders meeting on June 29, 2022, and Masashi Murata, an executive officer from SBI Holdings, was appointed president. Dojima Exchange, which had lost its core business with the delisting of rice futures, announced the opening of a precious metals market to revive its business, and on January 16, 2023, the listing of precious metals futures was approved by the government. At a press conference on the same day, President Murata stated that he would work to reopen rice futures and revitalize the agricultural products and sugar markets. When asked by a reporter about his thoughts on rice futures, he replied, "Our company was named after the historic 'Dojima Rice Exchange. We want more people to use this exchange so that we can pass on to the next generation the tradition and pride of the world's first futures trading to future generations. After all, rice futures is one of the issues that we must tackle as it bears the name "Dojima. Unfortunately, the exchange was not approved in 2021, but we received a variety of suggestions. It is difficult to solve the issues raised in a short period of time, but if we do not act, we will not be able to restart the project. I also wonder if we should leave the absence of a price formation function in a public place despite the fact that it is a major agricultural product, and the fact that there is a need for rice futures but no place to materialize it - as it is. I would like to make efforts to reopen the market based on this point. He also stated that he would promote the history of the "Dojima Rice Exchange," and would work to increase the company's visibility by deepening exchanges with client companies, universities, and research institutions.

Due to strong demand for the resumption of rice futures trading, the Dojima Exchange is sought to re-list the rice futures market by assessing the needs of trading participants and production and distribution businesses. Two physical rice markets are scheduled to open in the fall of 2023, and if the physical rice market functions effectively, price fluctuations due to weather and other factors If the physical rice market functions effectively, the need for rice futures contracts that can hedge against price fluctuations due to weather and other factors is expected to increase.

Following months of preparation, ODEX listed Dojima Rice Average® futures, index futures linked to the MAFF Relative Transaction Price and Volume Report produced by the Ministry of Agriculture, Forestry, and Fisheries (MAFF) and the DI sentiment survey announced monthly by the Rice Grain Organization.

== Historical notes ==
Osaka Dojima Exchange, Inc. (Japanese: 株式会社堂島取引所, Hepburn: Kabushiki-gaisha Dōjima Torihikijo; "Dōjima Exchange") (ODEX), formerly known as Osaka Dojima Commodity Exchange (ODEX) until 10 August 2021, is a futures exchange based in Osaka, Japan. It started as the Osaka Grain Exchange in 1952. In 1993 it merged with the Osaka Sugar Exchange and the Kobe Grain Exchange, taking the name Kansai Agricultural Commodities Exchange. The exchange merged with the Kobe Raw Silk Exchange in 1997, becoming the Kansai Commodities Exchange (KEX), and with the Fukuoka Commodities Exchange in 2006. In February 2013 it took over the rice exchange from the Tokyo Grain Exchange and renamed Osaka Dojima Commodity Exchange. For most of its history, this exchange was a membership organization owned by members of the exchange, but it demutualized and became a business corporation (kabushiki gaisha) named Osaka Dojima Commodity Exchange, Inc. on 1 April 2021. In August 2021, the company took its current name, Osaka Dojima Exchange, Inc.

Historical Product Listings

- Azuki (red beans) — grade 2 produced in Hokkaidō, other grades or origins at a discount
- Coffee index — cash settled average of arabica and robusta on the Tokyo Grain Exchange
- Corn 75 index — cash settled average price of corn at Tokyo Grain Exchange, Fukuoka Futures Exchange and Chicago Board of Trade and soybean meal at Chicago Board of Trade
- Frozen shrimp — frozen raw headless shell-on black tiger prawns for delivery at Osaka or Kobe
- IOM soybeans (possibly GMO)
- Non-GMO soybeans — identity-preserved number 2 yellow soybeans of certain United States states origin, delivered in Japan
- Raw silk — 27 denier 3A produced in Japan, delivered to Kobe or Yokohama
- Raw sugar — from various countries of origin, delivery at various Japanese ports
- Rice
- Precious metals: Gold, silver, and platinum
- Dojima Rice Average®

== See also ==
- Osaka Exchange
- Tokyo Commodity Exchange
- Dōjima Rice Exchange
- List of futures exchanges
- List of commodities exchanges
- List of futures exchanges
- Tokyo Commodity Exchange
- Chubu Osaka Commodity Exchange
- Dojima Rice Exchange
- Honma Munehisa
- Candlestick Chart
- Technical Analysis
