= Japan Securities Clearing Corporation =

Clearing organization in Japan

Japan Securities Clearing Corporation (JSCC) is a clearing house and financial services company that clears transactions for the Japanese securities market and commodity market controlled by the Japan Exchange Group, of which it is a subsidiary. JSCC was founded in 2002 and provides services to security or commodity holders, brokers, or dealers.

== Overview ==
JSCC was founded in 2002 by five Japanese exchanges (Tokyo Stock Exchange, Osaka Securities Exchange (now Osaka Exchange), Nagoya Stock Exchange, Sapporo Securities Exchange, Fukuoka Stock Exchange) and the Japan Securities Dealers Association, and commenced operations in January 2003. It merged with Japan Commodity Clearing House Co., Ltd. (JCCH) owned by Tokyo Commodity Exchange on July 27, 2020. In association with the merger with JCCH, JSCC launched the clearing service related to the listed commodity derivative transactions on Osaka Exchange, Tokyo Commodity Exchange, and Osaka Dojima Commodity Exchange (now Osaka Dojima Exchange).

== See also ==
- Depository Trust & Clearing Corporation
- Eurex
- London Clearing House
