= Pricelock =

Pricelock, Inc.
- Type: Private
- Industry: Energy; Oil; Natural gas
- Founded: Redwood City, California, United States (December 2006)
- Headquarters: Redwood City, California and Washington (state), United States
- Key people: Robert M. Fell, Founder & Executive Co-Chairman; Naveen Agarwal, Chief Executive Officer
- Products: Fuel hedging Fuel price risk management Employee Incentive programs Carbon footprint

Pricelock is an American oil company. It provides fuel hedging for small and medium-sized enterprises.

== Company history ==
Founded in 2006, Pricelock is headquartered in Redwood City, California. A deal with Chrysler in May 2008 guaranteed new-car buyers a gasoline price of $2.99 for three years. While the deal didn't stop Chrysler from going into bankruptcy, it brought Pricelock 24,500 new customers, and led to a similar deal with Hyundai. In March 2011, Pricelock raised over $12 million in second-round financing, and expects to be profitable by the end of 2012.

== See also ==
- Fuel hedging
- Fuel price risk management
- Fleet management
