= IOM =

IOM may refer to:

- Indian Order of Merit, a military and civilian decoration in British India
- Five-seven IOM (Individual Officer Model), variant of the FN Five-seven
- Infraorbital margin, the lower margin of the eye socket
- Institute of Medicine, a not-for-profit, non-governmental American organization founded in 1970
- Institute of Medicine, Nepal, a medical school in Kathmandu, Nepal
- Institute of Occupational Medicine in the UK
- Institute for Organization Management, an Affiliate organization of the United States Chamber of Commerce
- Institute of Oriental Manuscripts of the Russian Academy of Sciences
- International Organization for Migration, a United Nations agency
- International One Metre (radiosailing), a class of radio sailing boat
- Intraoperative monitoring (neurophysiogical testing during surgery)
- IOM soybeans, an industrial designation for soybeans from the U.S. states of Indiana, Ohio, and Michigan
- ISDN-oriented Modular Interface
- Isle of Man, a self-governing British Crown Dependency, located in the Irish Sea
- Isle of Man Airport, its IATA airport code
