= CCOM =

CCOM may refer to

- C-COM — Central Japan Commodity Exchange
- Central Conservatory of Music, in Beijing, China
- Center for Coastal & Ocean Mapping, a hydrographic research center at the University of New Hampshire
- CCOM - Chicago College of Osteopathic Medicine
- Roy J. and Lucille A. Carver College of Medicine, Iowa City, Iowa
