= Kavaruganda =

Kavaruganda is a Rwandan surname. Notable people with the surname include:

- Guillaume Kavaruganda (born 1969), Rwandan diplomat
- Joseph Kavaruganda (1935–1994), Rwandan jurist
