= Japan Exchange Group =

Japanese financial instruments exchange holding company and its corporate group

Japan Exchange Group, Inc.

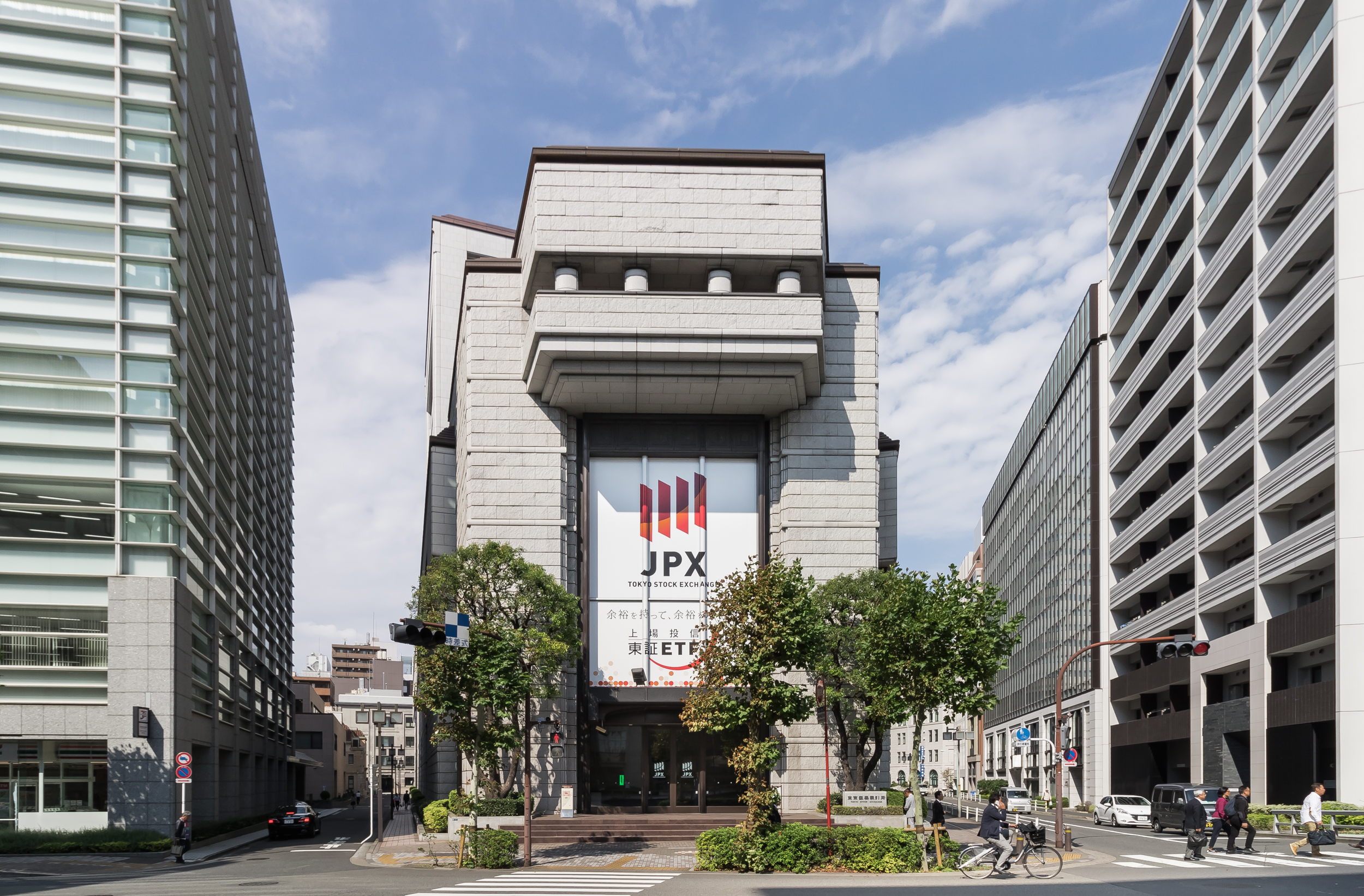
- Facade of the JPX head office (Tokyo Stock Exchange building)
- Native name: 株式会社日本取引所グループ
- Romanized name: Kabushiki gaisha Nippon Torihikijo Gurūpu
- Formerly: Osaka Securities Exchange Co., Ltd. (2001–2013)
- Type: Public KK
- Traded as: TYO: 8697
- Industry: Financial markets
- Predecessors: Tokyo Stock Exchange Group, Inc.
- Founded: April 1, 1949; 77 years ago (as Osaka Securities Exchange); 1 April 2001; 25 years ago (as Osaka Securities Exchange Co., Ltd.)
- Headquarters: Kabutocho, Chūō, Tokyo, Japan
- Area served: Japan
- Key people: Hiromi Yamaji, President & CEO (2023-)
- Services: Securities exchange; Derivatives exchange; Central counterparty clearing; Market data
- Number of employees: 1,223 (2022)
- Subsidiaries: Tokyo Stock Exchange; Osaka Exchange; Tokyo Commodity Exchange; JPX Market Innovation & Research; Japan Securities Clearing Corporation
- Website: jpx.co.jp/

Japan Exchange Group, Inc. (株式会社日本取引所グループ, Kabushiki-gaisha Nippon Torihikijo Gurūpu; Corporate Number: 9120001098575), abbreviated as JPX or Nippon Torihikijo, is a Japanese financial services company headquartered in Tokyo and Osaka. It is a "financial instruments exchange holding company" subject to the regulations of the Financial Instruments and Exchange Act enforced by the Financial Services Agency of Japan. It is also monitored by a separate self-regulatory body called Japan Exchange Regulation (JPX-R), dedicated to ensuring neutral and effective self-regulation operations defined under the Financial Instruments and Exchange Act.

The exchange group was formed by the merger of Tokyo Stock Exchange Group, Inc. and Osaka Securities Exchange Co., Ltd. on January 1, 2013. As a result of this merger and market reorganization, the Tokyo Stock Exchange (TSE) became the sole securities exchange of JPX and the Osaka Exchange (OSE) became the largest derivatives exchange of JPX.

JPX owns three licensed "financial instruments exchange" corporations: Tokyo Stock Exchange, Inc., Osaka Exchange, Inc., and Tokyo Commodity Exchange, Inc. (TOCOM). It also has an IT services and research arm, JPX Market Innovation & Research (JPXI), and a central clearing counterparty, Japan Securities Clearing Corporation (JSCC).

As of July 2024, JPX is the world's fifth-largest stock exchange operator, behind NYSE, NASDAQ, SSE, and Euronext, exceeding $5.8 trillion in July 2024.

== History ==
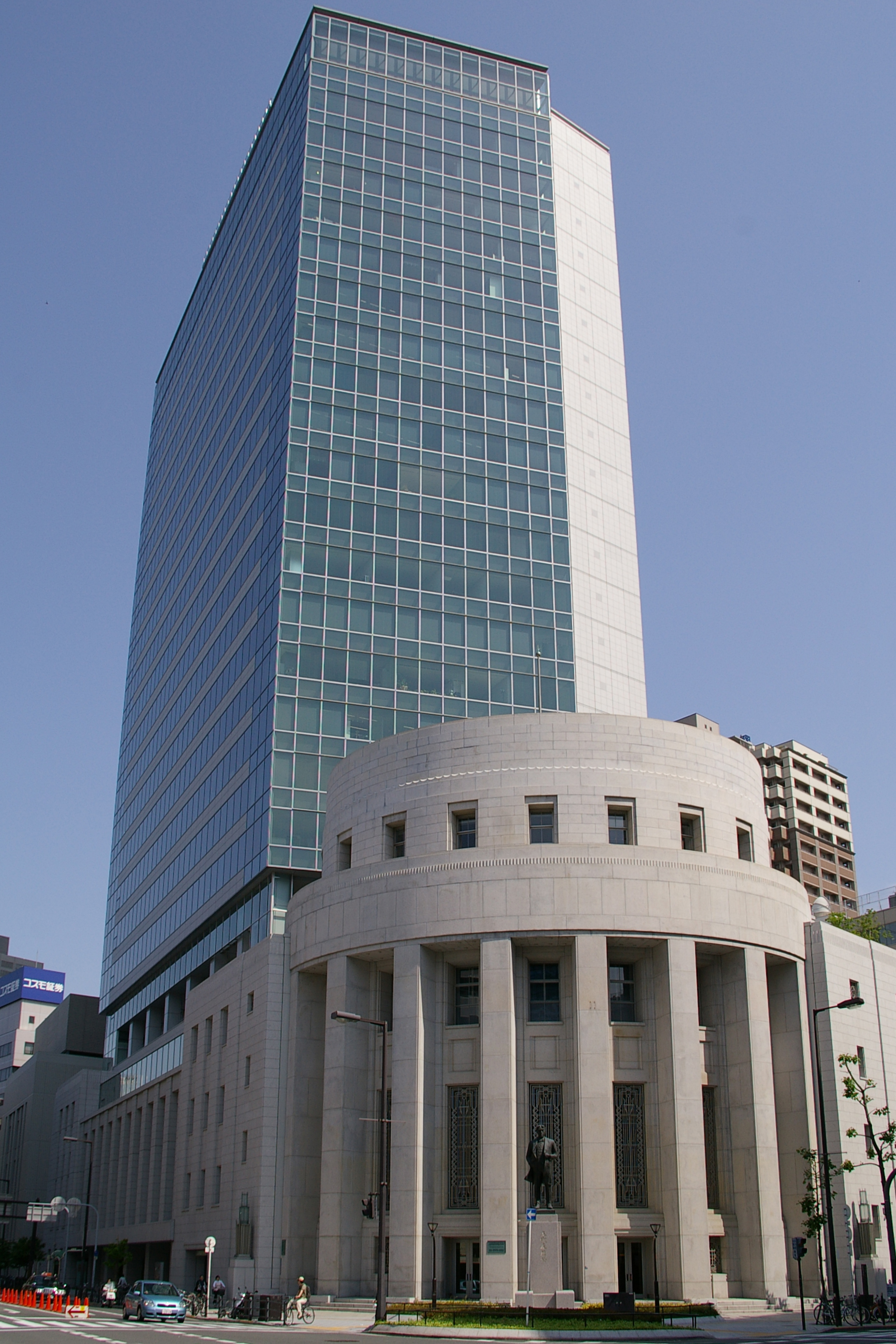
JPX Osaka head office and Osaka IPO center (Osaka Securities Exchange Building)

The roots of JPX trace back to November 22, 2011, when TSE and OSE decided to merge into one, as a solution to slowing market conditions in Japan. The merger was subsequently approved on July 5, 2012, when the Japan Fair Trade Commission approved the TSE-OSE merger, paving the way for the formation of JPX. On January 1, 2013, JPX was officially launched. The remainder of the merger was realized through a series of changes:

- On January 4, 2013, JPX was listed at TSE's First Section (8697). JPX also assumed OSE's own ticker symbol (also 8697).
- On July 16, 2013, The cash equity market of OSE was transferred and integrated into TSE. The self-regulatory operations of OSE were integrated into Tokyo Stock Exchange Regulation. The derivatives clearing operations of OSE were integrated into Japan Securities Clearing Corporation.
- On October 1, 2013, Japan Securities Clearing Corporation merged with Japan Government Bond Clearing Corporation.
- On March 24, 2014, Osaka Securities Exchange Co., Ltd was renamed Osaka Exchange, Inc. The TSE derivatives market was transferred and integrated into OSE.
- On April 1, 2014, Tokyo Stock Exchange Regulation was renamed Japan Exchange Regulation.
- On July 11, 2014 JPX signed a comprehensive Memorandum of Understanding (MOU) with Bank of China Limited.
- On November 1, 2014, TSE and OSE opened a joint representative office in Hong Kong.

In December 2014, JPX concluded a Letter of Interest (LOI) with Singapore Exchange. In the same month, JPX signed a joint venture agreement with Daiwa Institute of Research Ltd., the research arm of Daiwa Securities Group, and Myanma Economic Bank to establish Yangon Stock Exchange.

In May 2015, TSE and OSE opened a joint branch office in Singapore.

On October 1, 2019, JPX acquired Tokyo Commodity Exchange, Inc. (TOCOM), to expand its derivatives trading business in the commodity market. In turn, TOCOM became a wholly owned subsidiary of the Group.

On November 25, 2021, JPX launched a new subsidiary, JPX Market Innovation & Research, Inc. (JPXI), which would provide financial market data and price index services and system-related services to financial data vendors.

On April 1, 2022, in order to strengthen business activities in the Kansai region, JPX established Osaka Head Office and Osaka IPO Center in the Osaka Securities Exchange Building at Kitahama, Osaka. The Osaka site would take over the entire operations of JPX in the event of a wide-ranging disaster in the National Capital Region. TSE and OSE transferred and integrated their data and digital businesses into JPXI. TSE also merged its IT services arm, Tosho System Service Co., Ltd. (TSS), into JPXI, which would inherit the rights and obligations of all business carried out by TSS, such as system development, operations, consulting, and telecommunication services.

In July 2023, JPX launched a new stock market index, the JPX Prime 150 Index, to track the performance of the Japanese blue chips. Subsequently, on March 18, 2024, Nomura Asset Management listed an exchange-traded fund (ETF) for the index on TSE, the same day that index futures contract was launched on OSE.

== Senior leadership ==
The JPX has been led by a President & CEO (combined in one role) since its formation in 2013.

=== List of presidents and CEOs ===
- Atsushi Saito (2013–2015)
- Akira Kiyota (2015–2023)
- Hiromi Yamaji (since April 2023)

== Subsidiaries ==
JPX is a corporate group formed by the holding company, Japan Exchange Group, Inc., and its subsidiaries:

- Tokyo Stock Exchange, Inc. (TSE) - operator of Tokyo Stock Exchange
- Osaka Exchange, Inc. (OSE) - operator of Osaka Exchange
- Tokyo Commodity Exchange, Inc. (TOCOM) - operator of Tokyo Commodity Exchange
- JPX Market Innovation & Research, Inc. (JPXI) - IT services and research arm
- Japan Exchange Regulation (JPX-R) - self-regulatory body
- Japan Securities Clearing Corporation (JSSC) - clearing house
- Other consolidated subsidiaries

== See also ==
- 2013 in Japan
- List of commodities exchanges
- List of futures exchanges
- List of stock exchanges
- QUICK Corp
- Yangon Stock Exchange
- CCP Global

== Sources ==
- "JPX Report 2022" (PDF). Japan Exchange Group, Inc.
