= Fukuoka Futures Exchange =

Fukuoka Futures Exchange (FFE) was a futures exchange founded 1893, based in Fukuoka, Japan. It was absorbed by Kansai Commodities Exchange, based in Ôsaka, and no longer exists. Trading was conducted at six specified session times through the day. At each session, a price was established for each contract month in each commodity. Daily price movement limits apply, including open position limits for members and customers. There were no position limits for hedging.

== Commodities traded ==
- Broiler chicken
- Corn
- Non-GMO IOM soybeans
- IOM soybeans
- Redbeans (Azuki)
- Soybean meal

== See also ==
- List of futures exchanges in Japan
- Security (finance)
