= Tokyo Stock Exchange Building =

- 東京証券取引所ビル
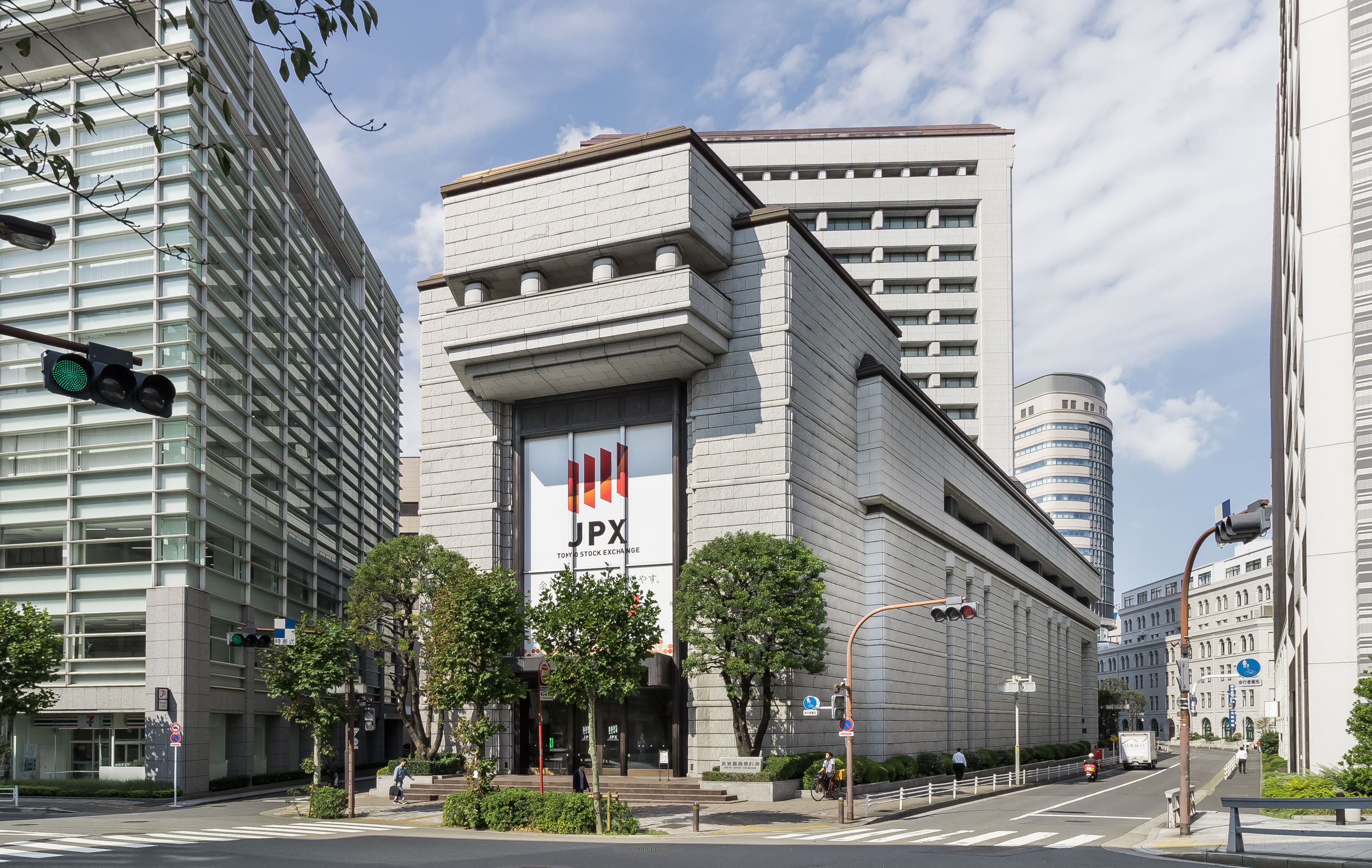
- Interactive map of the Tokyo Stock Exchange Building area

General information
- Location: Chuo, Tokyo, Japan
- Coordinates: 35°40′57.6″N 139°46′43.71″E
- Construction started: April 1982; 44 years ago
- Completed: April 1988; 38 years ago
- Opened: April 30, 1988; 38 years ago
- Owner: Heiwa Real Estate

Tokyo Stock Exchange Building (東京証券取引所ビル, Tōkyō Shōken Torihikijo) is an office building located in Nihonbashi, Chuo, Tokyo, Japan. It houses the headquarters of Tokyo Stock Exchange, but owned by Heiwa Real Estate.

== History ==
The reconstruction of the Tokyo Stock Exchange Building was first discussed in 1971. In March 1981, the basic plan for the new stock exchange building was finalized, with the main building to have 15 floors. On April 8, 1982, construction of the New Market Building began on the site of the old Main Building. The New Market Building was completed on October 31, 1984, and a completion ceremony was held on December 6. On May 13, 1985, the TSE held trading on the trading floor of the New Market Building for the first time. The second phase of construction, the New Main Building on the old Market Building site, had a groundbreaking ceremony held on October 3, 1985, and was completed on April 30, 1988.

The annual rent was 6.62 billion yen when the building was completed, rising to 7.36 billion yen in 1998, but then declined, dropping to 2.7 billion yen in 2016. In 2019, it was raised to 3 billion yen, the first increase in 25 years.
