= Osaka Mercantile Exchange =

Osaka Mercantile Exchange (OME) was a futures exchange based in Osaka, Japan that merged with the Nagoya-based Central Japan Commodity Exchange in 2007.

The exchange was formed on 1 October 1997 from the merger of the Osaka Textile Exchange and the Kobe Rubber Exchange. As of 1 January 2007 it merged into the Central Japan Commodity Exchange (C-COM).

Trading was conducted at six specified session times through the day. Commodities traded were as follows:

- Aluminium, for delivery at various warehouses in Japan
- Nickel, for delivery to designated warehouses
- RSS3 rubber, for delivery Kobe or Osaka
- Rubber index, cash settled on an average of rubber prices at eight worldwide exchanges
- TSR20 rubber, for delivery at Singapore warehouses

== See also ==
- List of futures exchanges
