= Guillaume Kavaruganda =

Rwandan diplomat (born 1969)

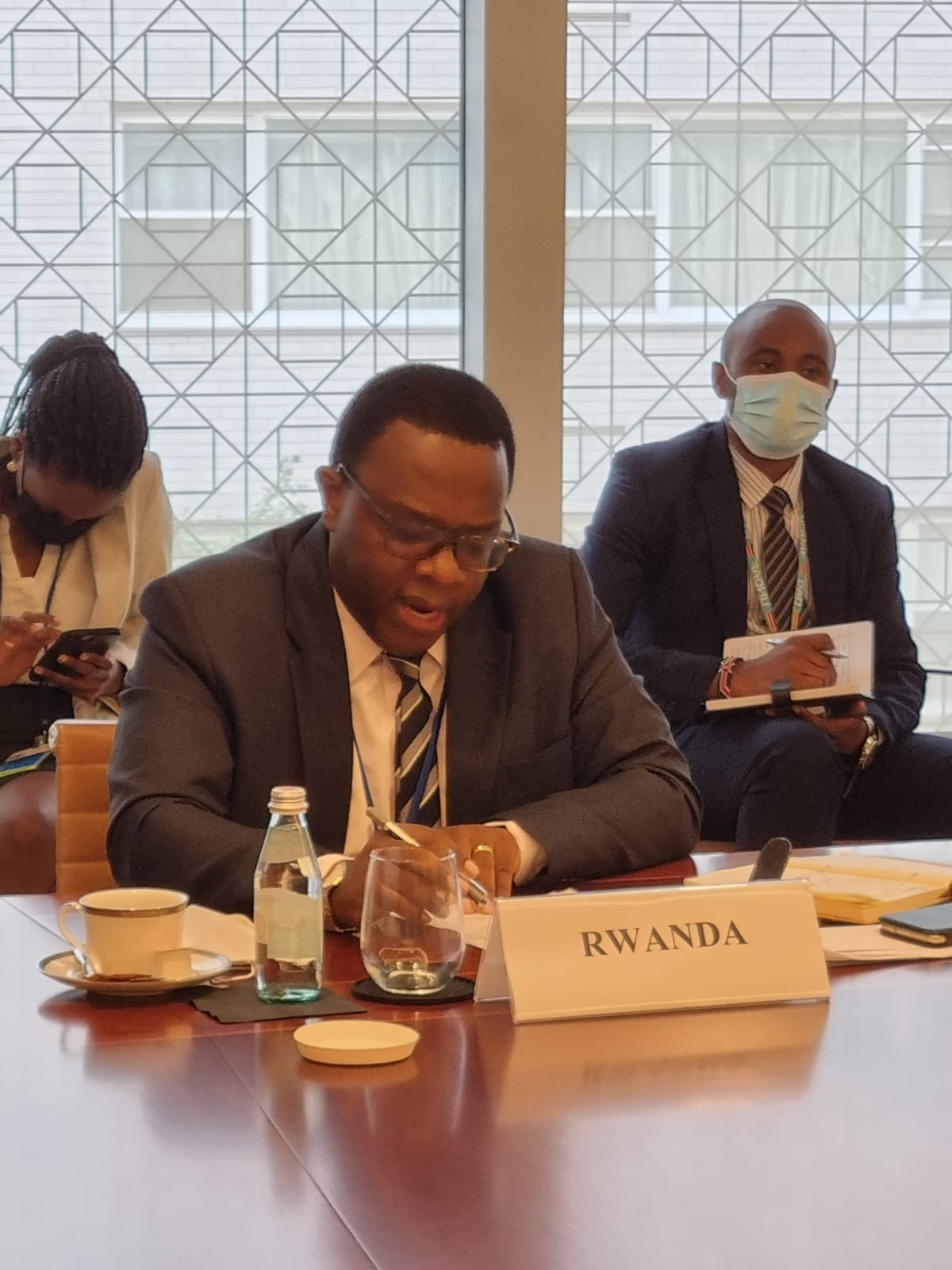
- Kavaruganda attending the UN General Assembly in September 2021
- Born: 13 February 1969 (age 57); Rwanda
- Education: University of Louvain la Neuve
- Alma mater: University of Perugia
- Occupation: Diplomat
- Years active: 1998–present
- Title: Ambassador
- Spouse: Ntezirizaza Alda

Guillaume Kavaruganda (born 13 February 1969) is a Rwandan career diplomat who has spent the majority of his career serving in a number of diplomatic capacities.

Kavaruganda was stationed at the Rwandan embassies in the United States of America, the Swiss Confederation, and the Netherlands. He is also the former High Commissioner of Rwanda to the Republic of Singapore.

During his time in the Southeast Asia-Pacific region, he was also concurrently Rwandan's High Commissioner to the Commonwealth of Australia, to New Zealand and ambassador to the Republic of Indonesia from 2015 to 2019.

== Early life and education ==
Kavaruganda was born in Nyarugenge-Kigali on 13 February 1969, born from Annonciata Mukarubibi and Dr. Joseph Kavaruganda who was a former prosecutor General of Republic of Rwanda for 6 years and a Chief Justice of Rwanda for 15 years.

He grew up in the residential area of Kiyovu and went to College Saint André for secondary education in Rwanda, and later went to Italy where he pursued his education in law at the University of Perugia. Kavaruganda received a Juris Doctor degree (Dottore in Giurisprudenza) in October 1995. After earning his professional degree required to practice law, he enrolled at the University of Louvain la Neuve Belgium, where he attained a Master's degree in International Law and European Union Law in 1997.

== Diplomatic career ==
=== Early career ===
Kavaruganda began his diplomatic career in March 1998, upon being assigned to work as a diplomatic officer within the directorate of political affairs, in the Rwandan Ministry of Foreign Affairs. Kavaruganda's initial posting to a mission abroad was as First Secretary in charge of Consular Affairs at the Rwandan Embassy in Washington, where he served from April 1999 until July 2002. He implemented several measures that made consular services more customer-oriented, convenient and accessible to the public such as introducing reforms in the authentication of documents and civil registration of nationals abroad.

In July 2002, Kavaruganda was promoted to the position of Second Counsellor and deputy chief of mission at the Rwanda Mission in Geneva which serves, on one hand, as the Rwandan Embassy to the Swiss Confederation, Austria and the Holy See. He assisted the Ambassador in strengthening and advancing bilateral relations and cooperation between Rwanda and those countries. He also served as a Chief Budget Officer, responsible for directing the financial management and budget activities of the Mission.

The Rwandan Mission in Geneva, on the other hand, serves as the Permanent Representation of Rwanda to the United Nations Office in Geneva (UNOG, OHCHR, UNDRR, UNCTAD) and other International Organizations in Geneva (WIPO, UNIDO, ITU, ILO, UNHRC, UNHCR, ICRC, IOM, OCHA, WHO, UNAIDS) as well as to the International Organizations in Vienna (UNOV, UNODC, IAEA, UNIDO, CTBTO, UNCITRAL, UN-OOSA).

Kavaruganda represented Rwanda in those multilateral organizations as the Deputy representative. He worked to promote and advance Rwanda's interests in Humanitarian and Migration, Human rights matters and health issues to name a few. He also focused on a wide range of policy issues including trade and economics. Kavaruganda remained in Geneva from 2002 to December 2005.

=== Senior diplomatic career ===
Upon completion of his term in Geneva, and shortly after returning from the Swiss Confederation, Kavaruganda was appointed Director of Protocol within the Rwandan Ministry of Foreign Affairs and Cooperation on January 28, 2006. In this capacity, he advised the Minister of Foreign Affairs in the fulfilment of the Rwandan Government's obligation relating to the national and international protocol in Rwanda. He also served as the link between the Ministry of Foreign Affairs and Foreign diplomats stationed in Rwanda and visiting dignitaries, a post he held from 28 January 2006 to 15 September 2009.

After leaving his position as Director of Protocol, Kavaruganda was asked to serve as an Expert in charge of Northern Europe and United Kingdom within the Directorate General of Bilateral and Multilateral Affairs. He served in this role from 15 September 2009 to 28 May 2010, when he was again posted abroad from headquarters. During his posting in Kigali and alongside his diplomatic career, he has been a visiting lecturer of International Development Law at Kigali Independent University. He is also a non-active registered member of the Rwanda Bar Association.

After a four-year stint at the headquarters, on Friday 28 May 2010, Kavaruganda was appointed as the first counsellor and just over a week later, he was promoted to become Minister Counsellor at the Rwanda mission in the Hague/the Netherlands. The Rwandan diplomatic mission in the Hague serves, on the one hand, as the Rwandan Embassy to the Netherlands and is also accredited to Bulgaria, Estonia, Latvia, Lithuania and Slovenia. As Deputy Head of Mission, he served as a key advisor to the chief of mission and played a wider corporate role in the running of the Embassy.

Alongside his various assignments in The Hague, Kavaruganda served as the Deputy Permanent Representative of Rwanda to the Organization for Prohibition of Chemical Weapons (OPCW) and to the International Court of Justice. Additional relevant duties included Kavaruganda being responsible for Rwanda's relations with the International Development Law Organization. He stayed in The Hague from May 2010 to July 2015.

=== As ambassador ===
Rising through the ranks of career diplomats of the Ministry of Foreign Affairs and International Cooperation, Kavaruganda's high Commission-ship and ambassadorial designation were approved by the Cabinet, in its session of 20/03/2015 and then unanimously confirmed by the Senate in its Plenary Session of 01/04/2015. He was appointed by the cabinet as a High Commissioner to Singapore, Rwanda's only Diplomatic mission to Southeast Asia-Pacific region. The High Commission in Singapore also served concurrently as the non-resident Mission to Australia, New Zealand and Indonesia.

Kavaruganda arrived in Singapore in mid-July 2015 with his wife, Ntezirizaza Alda. As High Commissioner-designate, Kavaruganda presented his credentials to the President of Singapore, Tony Tan Keng Yam on Thursday, July 30, 2015, to the Governor-General of Australia, Sir Peter Cosgrove on Thursday, November 24, 2016, and to the Governor-General of New Zealand, Dame Patsy Reddy on Wednesday, February 1, 2017. As Ambassador-designate, he presented his credentials to the Indonesian President Joko Widodo on Thursday, January 12, 2017. Kavaruganda began his duties right after his credentials were accepted.

Kavaruganda has since led the diplomatic mission in its objective to deepen ties and foster greater trade & investment linkages between Rwanda and Southeast Asia. He served in the region during a pivotal period for the strengthening of relations and friendships with those countries. Kavaruganda helped to promote trade and invited investments in Rwanda from Southeast Asia-Pacific region, as a result, Singapore became Rwanda's largest trading partner in the world and Rwanda's exports to Singapore tripled in three years. A highlight of his tenure was President Paul Kagame's visit to Singapore in September 2015, where he held important bilateral talks with Prime Minister Lee Hsien Loong and President Tony Tan.

In September 2019, Kavaruganda left his position as the head of the Rwandan diplomatic mission based in the Southeast Asia-Pacific region. He returned to the Headquarters and remained at the disposal of the Ministry of Foreign Affairs and International Cooperation until his appointment as the Ambassador to the Ministry entrusted with the duties of Director General for Europe, Americas and International Organizations, a position he held from May 11, 2020, until February 27, 2024.

== Personal life ==
Kavaruganda is married to Ntezirizaza Alda. He is fluent in the Italian language and customs, and he speaks English and French in addition to his Kinyarwanda native language.
