= Hiromi Yamaji =

Japanese businessman (born 1955)

- Born: 1955 (age 70–71); Japan
- Occupation: businessperson
- Known for: Group CEO at Japan Exchange Group

Hiromi Yamaji (Japan, 1955) is a Japanese executive currently holding the position of Group CEO at Japan Exchange Group, Inc. (JPX), which manages both the Tokyo Stock Exchange (TSE) and the Osaka Exchange.

He was educated in Japan and the United States, earning a law degree from Kyoto University and an MBA from the Wharton School of the University of Pennsylvania.

Yamaji began his professional career at Nomura Securities in 1977, where he remained for over three decades. During his time there, he took on multiple roles, including Executive Vice President and Head of Global Investment Banking. He was also appointed to leadership roles in Nomura's international branches, serving as President and CEO of Nomura Europe Holdings plc in London and as Chairman of Nomura Holding America Inc. in New York.

In 2013, he joined JPX as the CEO of the Osaka Exchange. He later became the CEO of the Tokyo Stock Exchange in 2021 and was appointed Group CEO of JPX in 2023. As a senior leader at JPX, Yamaji has overseen structural changes intended to improve the efficiency and governance of Japan's capital markets. These changes have included policies to address low-performing stock listings and efforts to promote greater transparency among listed firms.

In recognition of his contributions to the financial industry, he was named to the Futures Industry Association Hall of Fame in 2022 for his work in advancing the derivatives trading sector.
