= Nagoya Stock Exchange =

Stock trading market in Nagoya, Japan

Coordinates: 35°10′01″N 136°54′20″E

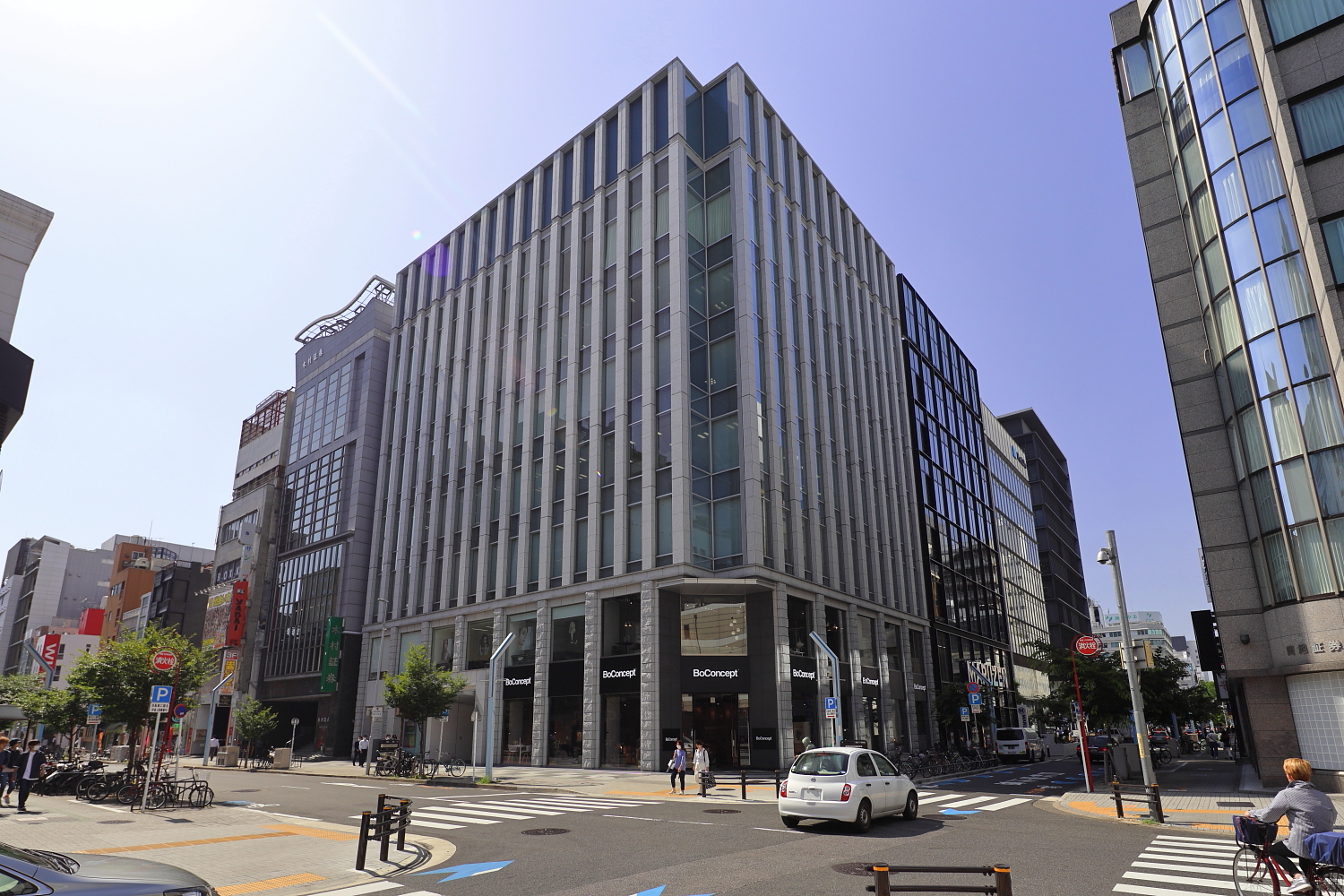
Nagoya Stock Exchange

Nagoya Stock Exchange (名古屋証券取引所 Nagoya Shōken Torihikijo, NSE) is a stock trading market in Nagoya, Japan. It is Japan's second largest exchange, behind the Tokyo Stock Exchange. It is operated by Nagoya Stock Exchange, Inc. (株式会社名古屋証券取引所).

== History ==
The Nagoya Stock Exchange (NSE) is the successor to the Nagoya Stock Exchange Co. Ltd., which was founded in 1886. It was founded in 1949 as a corporation with securities companies as members under the terms of the Securities and Exchange Law. In 2002, Nagoya Stock Exchange, Inc. was established after demutualization of NSE. The Nagoya Stock Exchange is a stock corporation that provides an Exchange Securities Market under authorization of the Prime Minister.

== Overview ==
The Nagoya Stock Exchange is one of the regional stock exchanges in Japan, together with the Fukuoka Stock Exchange and the Sapporo Securities Exchange. It is also known as Isemachi, after the name of the street on which it is located. As a result of the concentration of the Tokyo Stock Exchange, its share of trading volume is low and the amount of listings has gradually decreased over time.

== Trading times ==
Trading takes place from Monday to Friday with the following trading times for normal auction trades:

- Open morning session: 09:00 to 11:30
- Open afternoon session: 12:30 to 15:30

These times exclude public holidays declared by the Exchange in advance.

== See also ==
- List of East Asian stock exchanges
- List of stock exchanges
