= Kabutochō =

District in Chūō, Tokyo, Japan

Kabutochō 兜町
- Neighborhood
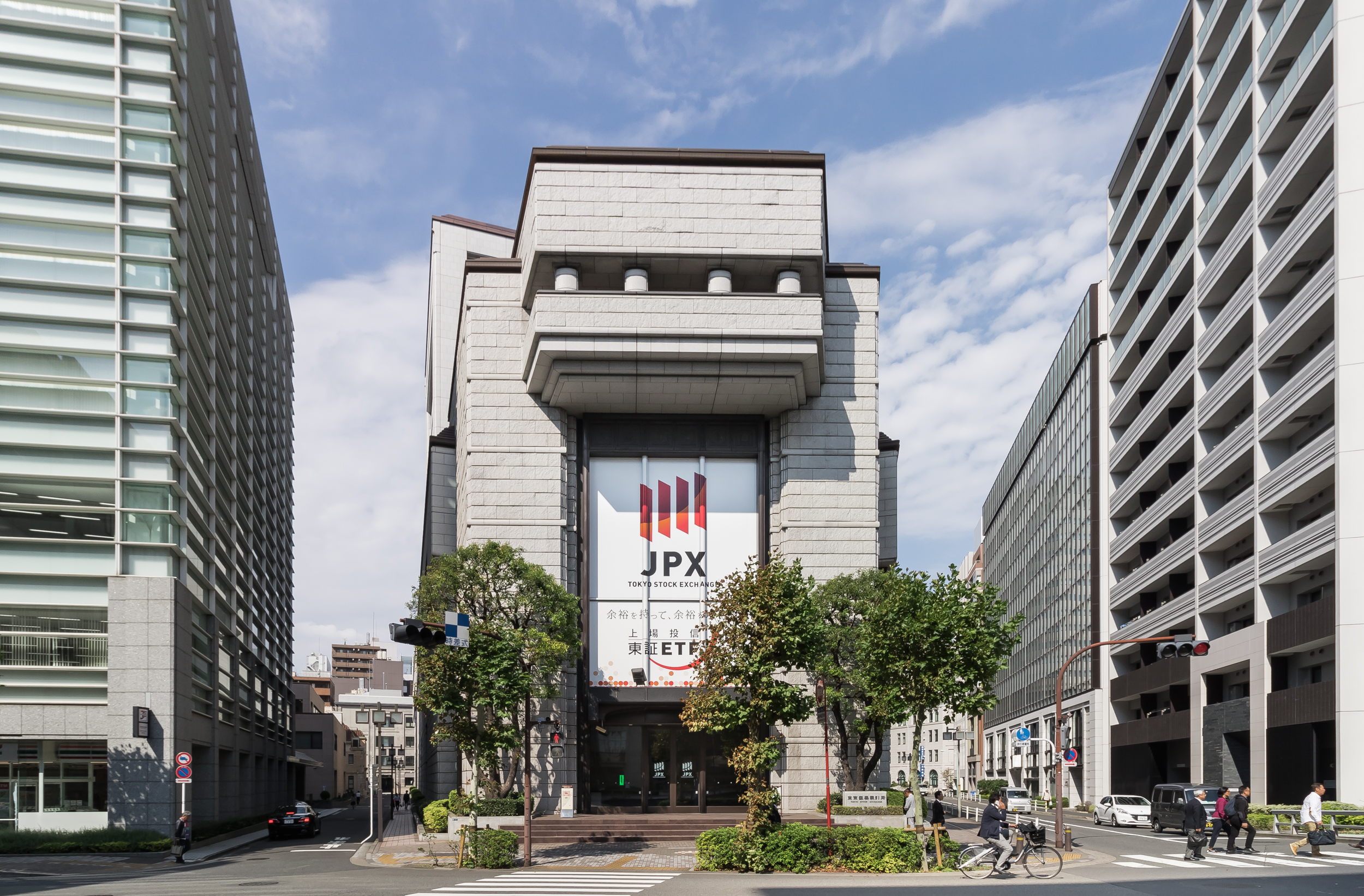
- Tokyo Stock Exchange
- Interactive map of Kabutochō
- Coordinates: 35°40′53″N 139°46′40″E
- Country: Japan
- Prefecture: Tokyo
- Special ward: Chūō

Population (1 October 2020)
  - Total: 723
- Time zone: UTC+09:00
- ZIP code: 103-0026
- Telephone area code: 03

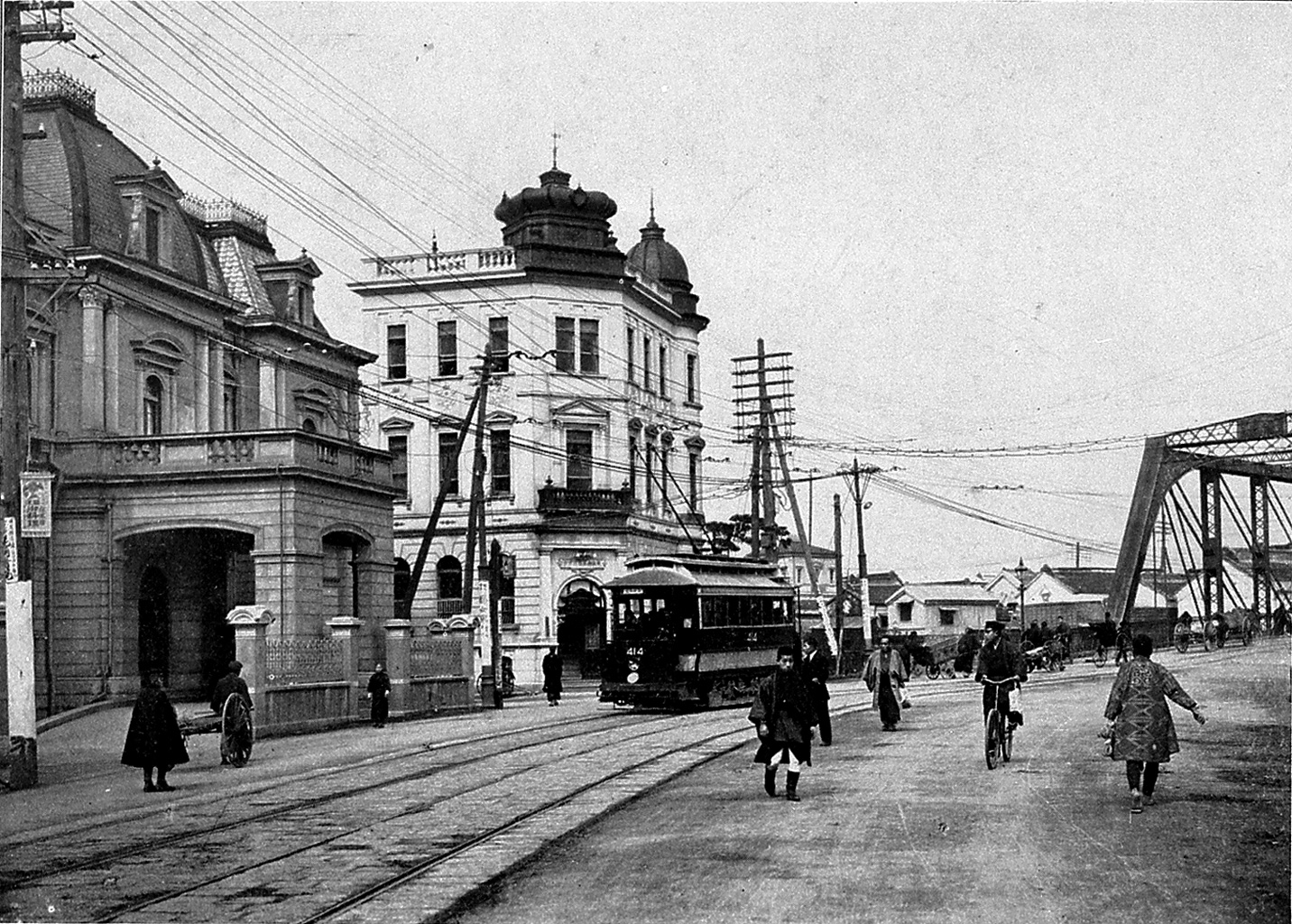
A street car runs in front of the Tokyo Stock Exchange.

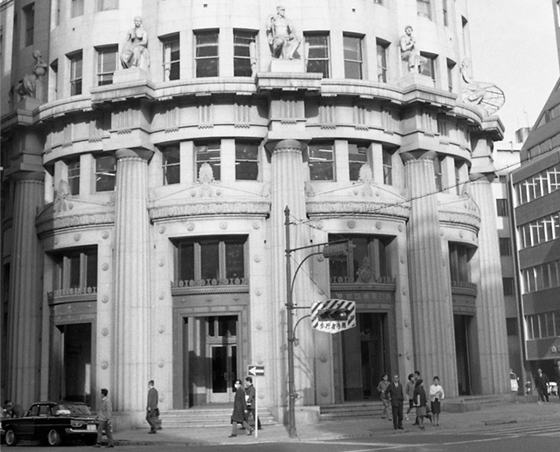
The Tokyo Stock Exchange during the 1960s

Kabutochō (Japanese: 兜町), or more formally Nihonbashi Kabutochō (Japanese: 日本橋兜町), is a neighborhood of Nihonbashi, Chuo-ku, Tokyo, Japan. It is the location of the Tokyo Stock Exchange and many securities companies, so is considered Japan's equivalent of Wall Street in New York City.

== History ==
The name of Kabutochō, literally the town of Kabuto (ancient helmet), is said to come from a legend that Minamoto no Yoshiie, upon his return from having conquered the north-eastern provinces in the eleventh century, buried his helmet there. It used to be a swampy area till the early 17th century, when the Daimyo who were forced to participate in the building of the Edo Castle built their residences.

By the Meiji period, the Kabutochō area came to be owned by the Mitsui family. In 1871, Eiichi Shibusawa established the First National Bank there, which later would become part of Mizuho Bank. As the Tokyo Stock Exchange was established there in 1878, the area soon became Japan's financial center, with many securities companies and banks setting up their headquarters and/or branch offices.

== Revitalization ==
Recently, as securities trading has become electronic, larger securities firms have already left Kabutochō to other premier locations in Tokyo. Heiwa Real Estate, the owner of the Tokyo Stock Exchange and Osaka Exchange buildings, has kicked off a Kabutochō Revitalization project. In 2020 Time Out named Kabutochō as the coolest neighborhood in Tokyo.

== Education ==
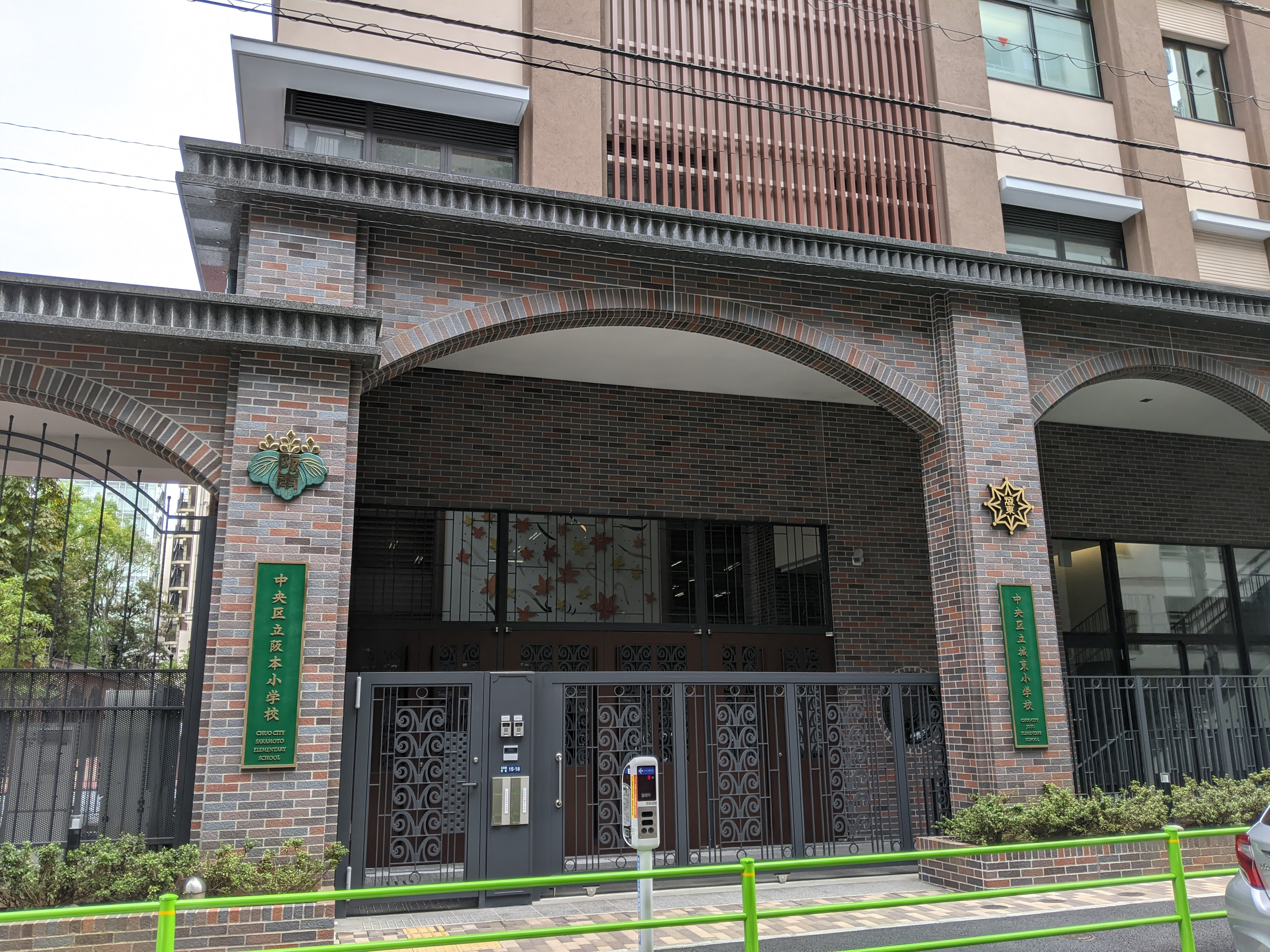
Sakamoto Elementary School (中央区立阪本小学校)

Public elementary and junior high schools are operated by Chuo City Board of Education.

Kabutocho is zoned to Sakamoto Elementary School (中央区立阪本小学校) and Nihonbashi Junior High School (日本橋中学校).

== See also ==
- Tokyo Stock Exchange
