= Energy derivative =

Derivative contract based on energy assets

An energy derivative is a derivative contract based on (derived from) an underlying energy asset, such as natural gas, crude oil, or electricity. Energy derivatives are exotic derivatives and include exchange-traded contracts such as futures and options, and over-the-counter (i.e., privately negotiated) derivatives such as forwards, swaps and options. Major players in the energy derivative markets include major trading houses, oil companies, utilities, and financial institutions.

Energy derivatives were criticized after the 2008 financial crisis, with critics pointing out that the market artificially inflates the price of oil and other energy providers.

== Definition ==
The basic building blocks for all derivative contracts are futures contracts and swaps contracts. In energy markets, these are traded on the New York Mercantile Exchange NYMEX, in Tokyo TOCOM and online through the IntercontinentalExchange.

=== Futures contracts ===
A futures contract is an agreement to buy or sell a commodity (for example, crude oil) at a specified price on a defined date in the future. The investor who agrees to buy the commodity is in a "long" position with respect to the commodity; the investor who agrees to sell is in a "short" position. The specified price, known as the delivery price, is agreed on the date the agreement is struck, together with volume, duration, and the underlying commodity. For example, in 2012 NYMEX futures contracts for light, sweet crude oil were based on delivery of 1,000 barrels of crude oil at Cushing, Oklahoma.

The parties to a futures contract settle daily during the term of the contract: i.e. money is exchanged between buyer and seller at the end of every trading day. This reduces the risk of either party defaulting on the futures contract. The exchange or clearing corporation guarantees the performance of both parties. However, according to derivatives trader and author Michael Durbin, in the event of highly unusual market conditions widespread defaults on futures contract obligations are possible.

Typically, the parties to the contract close out the contract prior to the delivery date. According to Durbin, early cancellations occurs in about 99% of all futures contracts. Depending upon the contractual terms, if the contract is not cancelled, on the expiration date the parties to the futures contract may either:

- settle in cash against an expiration price set by the exchange; or
- deliver/receive a physical amount of the underlying commodity (but this is rare).

=== Swap ===
A swap is an agreement whereby a floating price is exchanged for a fixed price over a specified period. It is a financial arrangement that involves no transfer of physical oil; both parties settle their contractual obligations by means of a transfer of cash. The agreement defines the volume, duration, fixed price, and reference index for the floating price (e.g., ICE Brent). Differences are settled in cash for specific periods usually monthly, but sometimes quarterly, semi-annually or annually.

Swaps are also known as "contracts for differences" and as "fixed-for-floating" contracts, terms that summarize the essence of these financial arrangements. The amount of cash is determined as the difference between the price struck at the initiation of the swap and the settlement of the index. In a swap contract, you trade with your counterpart (a company/institution/individual) and take risk on their capacity to pay you any amount that may be due at settlement. Thus, investors should carefully enter into a swap agreement with other party considering all these parameters.

== History ==
The first energy derivatives covered petroleum products and emerged after the 1970s energy crisis and the fundamental restructuring of the world petroleum market that followed. At roughly the same time, energy products began trading on derivatives exchange with crude oil, heating oil, and gasoline futures on NYMEX and gas oil and Brent Crude on the International Petroleum Exchange (IPE).

== Applications ==
There are three principal applications for the energy derivative markets:

1. Risk management (hedging)
2. Speculation (trading)
3. Investment portfolio diversification

=== Risk management ===
This describes the process used by corporations, governments, and financial institutions to reduce their risk exposures to the movement of oil prices. The classic example is the activity of an airline company, jet fuel consumption represents up to 23% of all costs and fluctuations can affect airlines significantly. The airline seeks to protect itself from rises in the jet fuel price in the future. In order to do this, it purchases a swap or a call option linked to the jet fuel market from an institution prepared to make prices in these instruments. Any subsequent rise in the jet price for the period is protected by the derivative transaction. A cash settlement at the expiry of the contract will fund the financial loss incurred by any rise in the physical jet fuel, allowing the companies to better measure future cash flows.

There are limitations to be considered when using energy derivatives to manage risk. A key consideration is that there is a limited range of derivatives available for trading. Continuing from the earlier example, if that company uses a specialized form of jet fuel, for which no derivatives are freely available, they may wish to create an approximate hedge, by buying derivatives based on the price of a similar fuel, or even crude oil. When these hedges are constructed, there is always the risk of unanticipated movement between the item actually being hedged (crude oil), and the source of risk the hedge is intended to minimize (the specialized jet fuel).

== See also ==
- Fuel price risk management
