= Fuel hedging =

Contractual tool to reduce cost for fuel

Fuel hedging is a contractual tool some large fuel consuming companies, such as airlines, cruise lines and trucking companies, use to reduce their exposure to volatile and potentially rising fuel costs. A fuel hedge contract is a futures contract that allows a fuel-consuming company to establish a fixed or capped cost, via a commodity swap or option. The companies enter into hedging contracts to mitigate their exposure to future fuel prices that may be higher than current prices and/or to establish a known fuel cost for budgeting purposes. If such a company buys a fuel swap and the price of fuel declines, the company will effectively be forced to pay an above-market rate for fuel. If the company buys a fuel call option and the price of fuel increases, the company will receive a return on the option that offsets their actual cost of fuel. If the company buys a fuel call option, which requires an upfront premium cost, much like insurance, and the price of fuel decreases, the company will not receive a return on the option but they will benefit from buying fuel at the then-lower cost.

== Background ==
The cost of fuel hedging depends on the predicted future price of fuel. Airlines may place hedges either based on future prices of jet fuel or on future prices of crude oil. Because crude oil is the source of jet fuel, the prices of crude oil and jet fuel are normally correlated. However, other factors, such as difficulties regarding refinery capacity, may cause unusual divergence in the trends of crude oil and jet fuel.

Companies which consume large volumes of fuel and do not hedge their fuel costs generally believes one, if not both, of the following:

1. The company has the ability to pass on any and all increases in fuel prices to their customers, without a negative impact on their profit margins.
2. The company is confident that fuel prices are going to fall and is comfortable paying a higher price for fuel if, in fact, their analysis proves to be incorrect.

Typically, airlines will hedge only a certain portion of their fuel requirements for a certain period. Often, contracts for portions of an airline's jet fuel needs will overlap, with different levels of hedging expiring over time.

During the 2009-2010 period, the studies for the airline industry have shown the average hedging ratio to be 64%. Especially during the peak stress periods, the ratio tends to increase.

Southwest Airlines has tended to hedge a greater portion of its fuel needs as compared to other major U.S. domestic carriers. Southwest's aggressive fuel hedging has helped the airline partially avoid financial consequences caused by airline industry downturns (e.g., the downturn caused by the 2000s energy crisis). Between 1999 and 2008, Southwest saved more than $4 billion through fuel hedging under the strategic leadership of former CFO Kelly (who became CEO in 2004, and President and Chairman in 2008).

== Providers of fuel hedging ==
Fuel hedging services are predominantly provided by specialist teams within fuel management companies, large oil companies and financial services institutions.

== See also ==
- Fuel price risk management
