= Price limit =

Established amount of increase or decrease of a price in a given trading day

A price limit is an established amount in which a price may increase or decrease in any single trading day from the previous day's settlement price.

In financial and commodity markets, prices are only permitted to rise or fall by a certain number of ticks (or by a certain percentage) per trading session. Similarly, index futures are often permitted to move a certain amount before the cash market opens.

== Examples ==
Price limits are used in both futures and equity markets, but their form varies by market and product. In futures markets, exchanges may set daily price limits for specific contracts. When a futures contract reaches its limit, the applicable exchange rules may allow trading only within the permitted range, temporarily halt trading until limits are expanded, or stop trading for the rest of the session.

In U.S. equity markets, the Limit Up-Limit Down Plan uses price bands for National Market System stocks. The mechanism is intended to prevent trades from occurring outside specified price bands and may lead to trading pauses when price movements are more substantial.
