= Central Japan Commodity Exchange =

Central Japan Commodity Exchange (C-COM) was a futures exchange based in Nagoya, Japan that closed in 2011.

== History ==
The exchange was established 1 October 1996 from the merger of the Toyohashi Dry Cocoon Exchange, the Nagoya Grain and Sugar Exchange and the Nagoya Textile Exchange, all three based in the Aichi prefecture, central Japan. Effective 1 January 2007 C-COM merged into the Osaka Mercantile Exchange. In 2010 the Japanese government amended the law governing the commodity futures industry, prohibiting unwanted solicitation. This caused increasing difficulty for C-COM and in January 2011 it ceased operation altogether.

Trading was conducted at six specified session times through the day. Commodities traded were:

- Eggs – cash settled
- Gasoil – JIS K2204 grade 1 or 2 (depending on contract month), for physical delivery
- Gasoline – JIS K2202 Grade 2, for physical delivery
- Ferrous scrap (introduced 11 October 2005) – Shindachi of various grades, for physical delivery
- Kerosene – JIS K2203 Grade 1, for physical delivery
- Aluminium
- Nickel
- RSS3 rubber
- Rubber index
- TSR20 rubber

Past commodities traded were Azuki beans, dried cocoons, cotton yarn, IOM soybeans, and non-GMO IOM soybeans.

== See also ==
- List of futures exchanges
