= Fukuoka Stock Exchange =

Stock exchange located in Fukuoka, Japan

- 福岡証券取引所
- Type: Stock exchange
- Location: Fukuoka, Japan
- Coordinates: 33°35′29″N 130°23′50″E
- Founded: 1949
- Key people: Hiroaki Okui (President)
- Website: www.fse.or.jp

Fukuoka Stock Exchange (FSE) is a stock exchange located in Fukuoka, Japan. It operates Q-Board, a special market for new companies. In August 2000, the exchange closed its trading floor and adopted the electronic trading system of Tokyo Stock Exchange. In January 2002, FSE reached an agreement with the four other Japanese stock exchanges and Japan Securities Dealers Association, JSDA to establish Japan Securities Clearing Corporation (JSCC).

== See also ==
- List of East Asian stock exchanges
- List of stock exchanges
