= IOM soybeans =

IOM soybeans is an industrial designation for soybeans from the U.S. states of Indiana, Ohio, and Michigan. Beans grown in those states have a high protein content that is valued by processors, in particular in Japan. IOM soybeans are traded on the following Japanese commodity exchanges:

- Kansai Commodities Exchange (KEX)
- Tokyo Grain Exchange (TGE) (including other US state origins);

and in the past were traded on:

- Central Japan Commodity Exchange (C-COM)
- Fukuoka Futures Exchange (FFE)

The Japanese contracts called "IOM soybeans" are unsegregated, meaning any mixture of genetically modified and not. Non-GM IOM soybeans in Japan are usually just called "Non-GM soybeans".
