= Energy exchange =

An energy exchange is an organisation that operates a wholesale multilateral electricity market, gas market, or both. Many companies, such as the Australian Energy Market Operator, trade gas and electricity. These exchanges often provide data to energy regulators.

== See also ==
Energy economics
