= ISDN-oriented Modular Interface =

ISDN-oriented Modular Interface (IOM) is a system architecture and its bus for communication between various VLSI ICs for the lower layers (ref. OSI model) of ISDN. It was developed by Siemens (today: Infineon), current revision is IOM-2. Its purpose is to enable modularity. Second sources are AMD, Alcatel, Plessey.

IOM-2 is a 4-wire serial, full-duplex link. 2 operation modes are available: line card mode and terminal mode; which differ only in number and purpose of the channels. Signals are:

- DCL (data clock, 16 kHz * N, where N = number of channels)
- FSC (frame sync, 8 kHz)
- DU (data upstream)
- DD (data downstream)
