= Heiwa Real Estate =

Japanese company

Heiwa Real Estate Company, Ltd.
- Company type: Public (K.K)
- Traded as: TYO: 8803
- Industry: Housing development; Leasing; Real estate development
- Founded: July 1947; 78 years ago
- Headquarters: Tokyo, Japan
- Key people: Sadao Yoshino (CEO)
- Number of employees: 88 (as of March 31, 2011)
- Website: http://www.heiwa-net.co.jp/

Heiwa Real Estate is a Japanese real estate and construction company. It is listed on the Nikkei 225.
