= Corporate Number =

Japanese government identifier

The Corporate Numbers (Japanese: 法人番号, Hepburn: hōjin bangō) are 13-digit identifiers assigned by the National Tax Agency to companies and other organizations registered in Japan. When filing tax returns or other forms related to taxation, employment or social insurance, assignees are required to print their own Corporate Number on the document.

Corporate Numbers were implemented in 2015, along with the 12-digit Individual Numbers, which identify individual residents (including resident aliens) in Japan. Unlike Individual Numbers, whose disclosure to the public is punishable, Corporate Numbers are published by the National Tax Agency.

== Format ==
A Corporate Number consists of 13 digits.
