= Fuel price risk management =

Strategies used to reduce financial exposure to fuel-price volatility

Fuel price risk management, a specialization of both financial risk management and oil price analysis and similar to conventional risk management practice, is a continual cyclic process that includes risk assessment, risk decision making and the implementation of risk controls. It focuses primarily on when and how an organization can best hedge against exposure to fuel price volatility. It is generally referred to as "bunker hedging" in marine and shipping contexts and "fuel hedging" in aviation and trucking contexts.

== Providers of fuel price risk management services ==
Fuel price risk management services are predominantly provided by specialist teams within fuel management companies, oil companies, financial institutions, utilities and trading companies. Examples include:

Fuel management companies – Mercatus Energy Advisors, INTL FCStone, World Fuel Services, Onyx Capital Advisory, Global Risk Management
Oil companies – Total S.A., Royal Dutch Shell, ExxonMobil, Koch Industries, BP
Financial institutions – BNP Paribas, Goldman Sachs, JP Morgan, Barclays plc, Macquarie Bank, Citigroup, Morgan Stanley, Wells Fargo
Utilities – RWE Supply and Trading GmbH, EdF
Independent trading companies – DRW, Optiver

== The fuel price risk management process ==
Similar to conventional risk management practice, fuel price risk management is considered a continual cyclic process that includes the following:

1 Establishing the context

current and future business environment
financial position and budgets
objectives and needs
required fuel consumption, etc.

2 Risk assessment

fuel cost calculations
risk identification
the organization's attitude to risk
exposure analysis to fuel price fluctuations
scenarios of various hedging strategies

3 Risk treatment

implementation of a fuel price risk strategy

4 Monitor and review

An alternative to the above described process is the following:

1 Identify, analyze and quantify the fuel related risks
2 Determine tolerance for risk and develop a fuel price risk management policy
3 Develop fuel price risk management implementation strategies
4 Establish controls and procedures
5 Initial implementation of fuel price risk management strategies
6 Monitor, analyze and reporting
7 Repeat the process on as needed basis

== Real investments as risk reduction ==
Energy efficiency measures can be seen as real capital investments that, in addition to reducing fuel costs, reduce exposure fuel price risk. As less fuel is consumed, a smaller cost component is susceptible to fluctuations in fuel prices. The value of this risk reduction can be calculated using the Tuominen-Seppänen method and its value has been shown to be approximately 10 % compared to direct cost savings for a typical energy efficient building.

== See also ==
- Commodity markets
- Commodity risk
- Energy derivative
- Liquidity risk
- Market risk
- Risk modeling
