= Osaka Exchange =

Japanese securities exchange located in Osaka

Osaka Exchange, Inc.
- The OSE uses the logo of its parent company, the Japan Exchange Group.

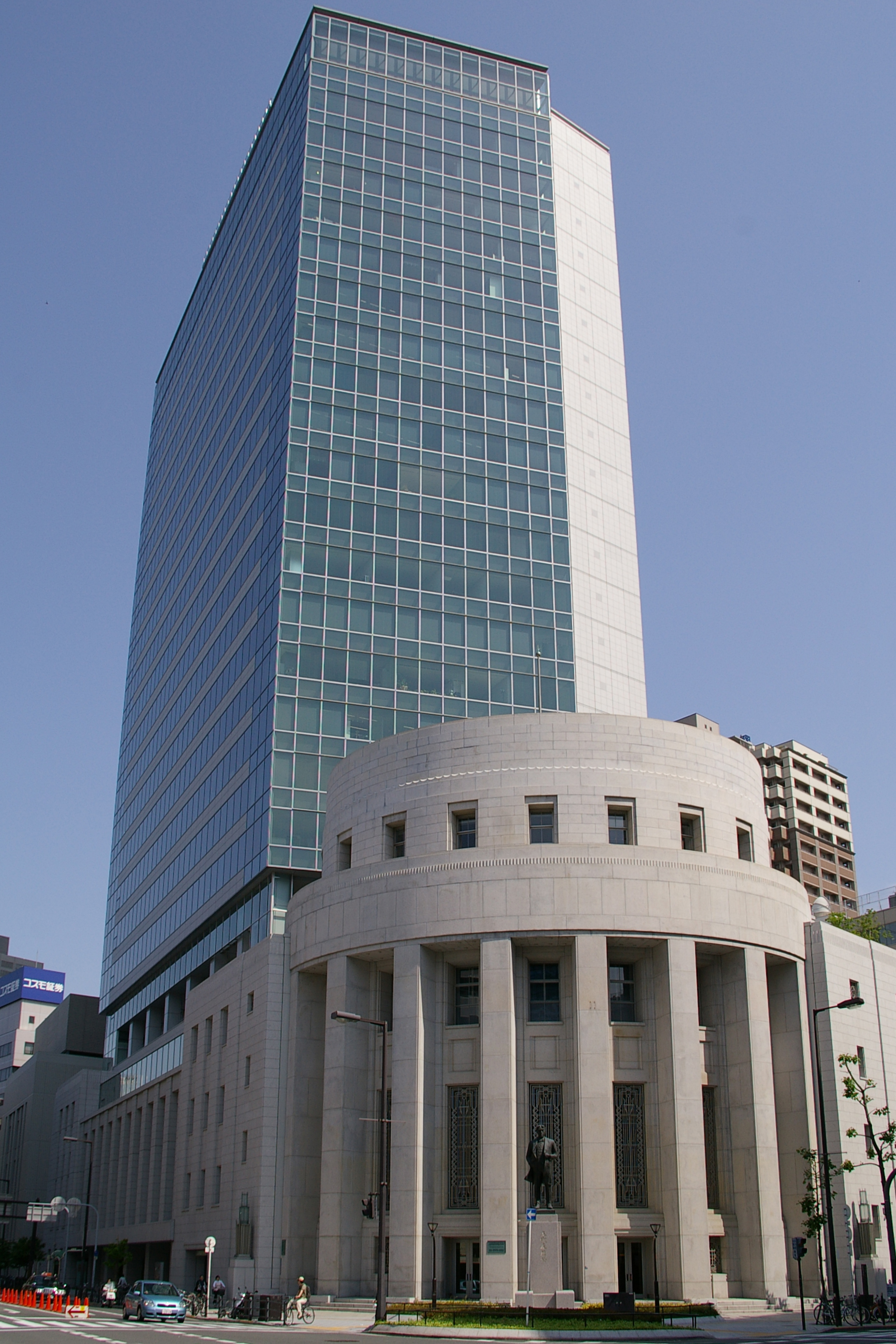
- Osaka Securities Exchange Building in Chūō-ku, Osaka
- Native name: 株式会社大阪取引所
- Type: Public subsidiary
- Industry: Financial
- Founded: April 1, 1949
- Headquarters: Osaka, Japan
- Key people: Hiromi Yamaji (President/CEO)
- Products: Derivatives exchange
- Number of employees: 207
- Parent: Japan Exchange Group
- Website: jpx.co.jp/02

Osaka Exchange, Inc. (株式会社大阪取引所, Kabushiki-gaisha Ōsaka Torihikijo), renamed from Osaka Securities Exchange Co., Ltd. (株式会社大阪証券取引所, Kabushiki-gaisha Ōsaka Shōken Torihikijo; OSE), is the largest derivatives exchange in Japan, in terms of amount of business handled.

As of 31 December 2007, the Osaka Securities Exchange had 477 listed companies with a combined market capitalization of $212 billion. The Nikkei 225 Futures, introduced at the Osaka Securities Exchange in 1988, is now an internationally recognized futures index. In contrast to the Tokyo Stock Exchange, which mainly deals in spot trading, the Osaka Securities Exchange's strength is in derivative products. The OSE is the leading Derivatives Exchange in Japan and it was the largest futures market in the world in 1990 and 1991. According to statistics from 2003, the Osaka Securities Exchange handled 59% of the stock price index futures market in Japan, and almost 100% of trading in the options market. Osaka Securities Exchange Co., which was listed on its Hercules market for startups in April 2004 is the only Japanese securities exchange which went public on its own market.

In 2013, the Osaka Securities Exchange merged with the Tokyo Stock Exchange Group to form the Japan Exchange Group. As a result, OSE transferred its stock exchange division to the Tokyo Stock Exchange and rebranded itself to the Osaka Exchange.

== History ==
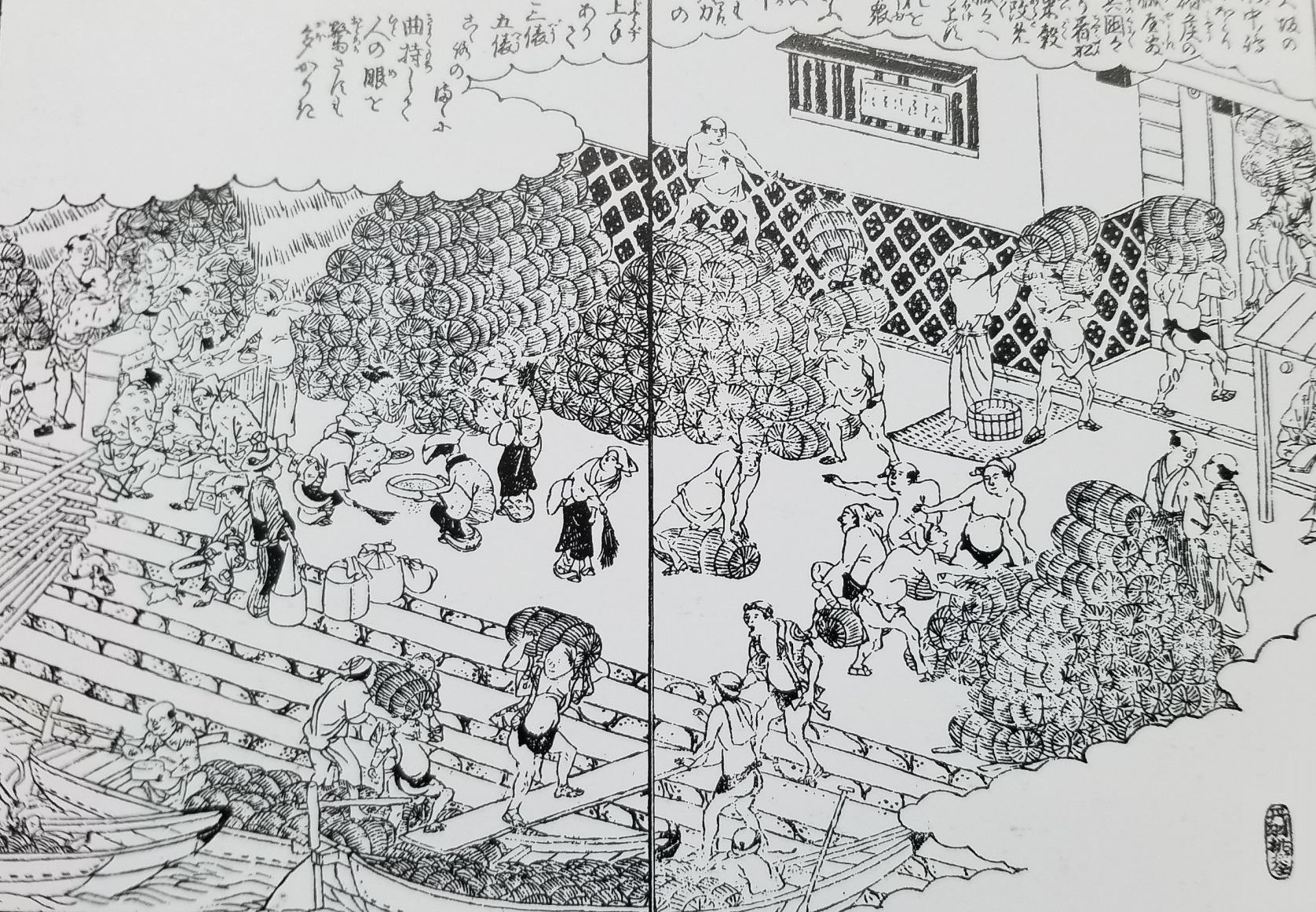
Osaka Dōjima Rice Exchange

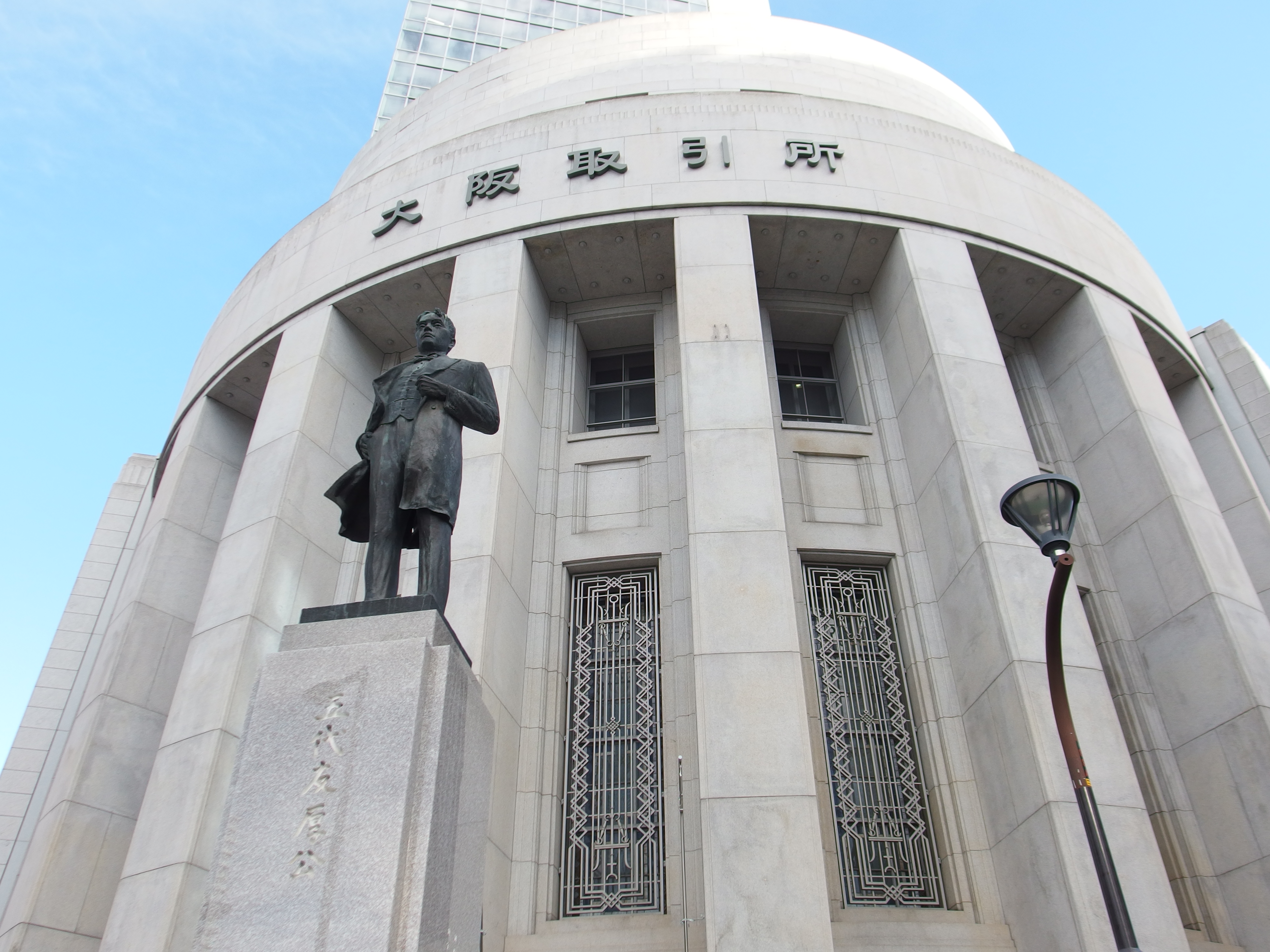
Statue of Godai Tomoatsu in front of the Osaka Securities Exchange

The birthplace for futures transactions: Dōjima Rice Exchange (堂島米会所 The origin of securities exchanges stems from the Edo period, when an exchange for rice and crops was established in Osaka, which at the time was the economic center of Japan. Each prefecture set up its own warehouses in Osaka for shipping and preservation of their rice (to be taxed by the government), and sold to merchants. One of the most famous merchants was "Yodoya", which was based in the southern part of the Yodoyabashi area. Some other merchants gradually gathered to create one market. This market was called "Yodoya-Komeichi", and was the first securities exchange in the nation.

Later on, this market was moved to Dōjima in 1697. The so-called "Dōjimakomekaisho", was a physical market that traded in rice-tickets or physical rice. In 1716, Cho-gomai transactions were introduced and recognized by the government in 1730 — this is said to be the origin of futures transactions in Japan.

In July 2006 OSE launched their newest futures contract the Nikkei 225 mini, which is one tenth of the size of the original Nikkei 225 Futures contract and highly popular among Japanese individual investors.

In September 2007 OSE established evening session for Stock Index Futures and Options. The trading hours is from 16:30 to 19:00 JST (7:30-10:00 in UTC). In July 2012 a planned merger with the Tokyo Stock Exchange was approved by the Japan Fair Trade Commission. Today, despite its name, trading for Osaka Stock Exchange takes place in Tokyo.

== Chronology ==
- June 1878 – Osaka Stock Exchange Co., Ltd. established
- June 1943 – The Exchange became the Osaka Division of the Japan Securities Exchange during the Pacific War.
- August 1945 – Japan Securities Exchange suspended operations
- April 1947 – Japan Securities Exchange dissolved.
- May 1948 – A new Securities and Exchange Law enacted
- April 1949 – Osaka Securities Exchange established
- June 1951 – Credit transaction system introduced
- April 1956 – Bond market reopened
- October 1961 – Second section for stocks established
- May 1970 – Convertible bond market opened
- October 1973 – The Exchange became an associate member of the Federation Internationale des Bourses de Valeurs (FIBV)
- September 1974 – Computerized Market Information System began operation
- April 1982 – Constitutional restrictions on the membership of foreign securities companies removed
- June 1983 – The Exchange became a member of EASEC (EAOSEF in 1990: East Asian and Oceanian Stock Exchanges Federation)
- November 1983 – "Special Designated Issues" System, called "New Second Section", introduced
- December 1984 – Ten Minute Earlier Opening System for representative issues selected from among the first section stocks introduced
- June 9, 1987 – Trading in "Osaka Stock Futures 50 (OSF50)" started
- September 1988 – Trading in Nikkei Stock Average Futures (Nikkei 225 Futures) started
- October 1988 – Computer-assisted trading system for OSF50 and Nikkei 225 Futures began operation
- June 1989 – Trading in Nikkei Stock Average Options (Nikkei 225 Options) started
- December 1989 – Computer-assisted trading system for Nikkei 225 Options began operation
- March 1991 – Computer-assisted trading system for stocks began operation
- May 1991 – The Exchange became a member of the IAOECH (IOMA in 1993:International Options Markets Association)
- December 1991 – The country fund market opened
- January 1992 – The Exchange received a No-action Letter from the US Commodity Futures Trading Commission (CFTC) for Nikkei 225 Futures contract
- March 1992 – The "OSF 50" ceased trading in its futures contracts (Trading of OSF 50 was ceased on March 20, 1992.)
- April 1992 – The Japan Securities Depository Centre (JASDEC), Osaka Office began its operation at the OSE
- February 1994 – Trading in Nikkei Stock Index 300 Futures and Options (Nikkei 300 Futures / Options) started
- May 1994 – The Exchange received a No-action Letter from US Commodity Futures Trading Commission (CFTC) for Nikkei 300 Futures contract.
- October 1994 – The Exchange became an affiliate member of the International Organization of Securities Commissions (IOSCO)
- May 1995 – Trading in "Nikkei 300 Stock Index fund" started
- January 1996 – "New Market", a system with "Issues listed under alternative listing criteria", introduced
- April 1996 – Nikkei 300 Futures Inter-month Spread Trading started
- October 1996 – Foreign stock market established
- May 1997 – Nikkei 225 Futures Inter-month Spread Trading started
- July 1997 – Equity Options Trading started
- December 8, 1997 – Trading floor for stocks closed and shifted completely to a computer assisted trading system
- December 1997 – Cross Trading System (for large block trades, execution at closing price and basket trades) started
- June 1998 – Trading in Sector Index Futures and Options started(Trading of these products was ceased on November 30, 2000.)
- December 1998 – New Market Section established
- January 1999 – J-NET Market opened
- March 1999 – The "Securities Transaction Tax" and "Exchange Tax" abolished
- June 1999 – A license contract for the use of SPAN with Chicago Mercantile Exchange concluded
- July 1999 – The Exchange obtained a No-Action Letter from the US Securities and Exchange (SEC) for Nikkei 225 Options, Nikkei 300 Options and Equity Options
- July 1999 – Full computerization of trading at the OSE was completed
- October 1999 – OSE ED-NET, an electronic disclosure network system established
- November 1999 – A clearing organization method introduced
- November 1999 – Non-Auction Large Block Trades for Stock Index Futures and Options started
- December 1999 – An agreement to establish the NASDAQ Japan Market announced
- February 2000 – private finance initiative (PFI) market established
- May 2000 – Nasdaq Japan Market established
- June 2000 – Trading on Nasdaq Japan Market started
- August 2007 – Gold-Price-Linked exchange-traded fund is listed in OSE (The first case in Japanese Market, besides stock exchange traded fund).
- September 2007 – Introduction of Evening Session for all the Stock Index Futures and Options
- October 2007 – SSE50-Linked exchange-traded fund is listed in OSE (The first case treated foreign Stock market index in Japanese Market, besides stock exchange traded fund).
- July 2012 – Japan Fair Trade Commission approved OSE's planned merger with the Tokyo Stock Exchange
- January 2013 – OSE, TSE merged into the Japan Exchange Group (日本取引所グループ, Nihon Torihikijo Gurūpu).

== See also ==
- List of East Asian stock exchanges
- List of stock exchanges
