= List of companies of Japan =

List of notable companies based in Japan

Location of Japan

This is a list of notable companies based in Japan. For further information on the types of business entities in this country and their abbreviations, see "Business entities in Japan". Note that 株式会社 can be (and frequently is) read both kabushiki kaisha and kabushiki gaisha (with or without a hyphen).

== Largest firms ==
This list shows firms in the Fortune Global 500, which ranks firms by total revenues reported before 31 March 2017.

Rank	Company	Revenue (US$ million)
6	Toyota	265,172
30	Honda	138,646
45	Japan Post Holdings	116,616
54	Nissan	107,868
55	Nippon Telegraph and Telephone	106,500
79	Hitachi	84,559
85	SoftBank Group	82,665
97	Sony	77,116
99	Eneos	76,629
103	Aeon	75,339
114	Panasonic	72,045
126	Nippon Life	68,684
129	Mitsubishi Corporation	68,301
130	Marubeni	68,057
145	Dai-ichi Life Holdings	63,522
165	Toyota Tsusho	58,586
177	Mitsubishi UFJ Financial Group	54,769
179	Seven & I Holdings	54,217
186	Tokyo Electric Power Company	52,809
192	Sumitomo Mitsui Banking Corporation	52,026
198	Nippon Steel	51,164
204	Itochu	49,732
209	Tokio Marine	48,731
221	MS&AD Insurance Group	47,095
229	Denso	46,106
236	KDDI	45,508
246	Mitsui	44,155
250	Sumitomo Group	43,570
279	Mitsubishi Electric	39,995
309	Meiji Yasuda Life	37,160
311	Mitsubishi Heavy Industries	37,103
313	Fujitsu	36,991
317	Canon	36,388
326	Toshiba	35,630
329	Aisin	35,281
342	Daiwa House	34,262
347	Sompo Holdings	34,028
348	Suzuki	33,912
350	Sumitomo Life	33,821
352	Mitsubishi Chemical Group	33,616
358	JFE Holdings	33,202
365	Bridgestone	32,495
367	Mizuho Financial Group	32,142
378	Mazda	31,356
384	Subaru Corporation	30,735
398	Idemitsu Kosan	29,606
420	Kansai Electric Power Company	28,283
425	Sumitomo Electric Industries	27,820
443	East Japan Railway Company	26,627
462	Chubu Electric Power	25,753
463	NEC	25,673

== 0-9 ==
English	Japanese	Rōmaji	TSE
77 Bank	株式会社七十七銀行	Kabushiki-gaisha Shichijūshichi Ginkō	TYO: 8341
81 Produce	81プロデュース	Eitiwan Purodyūsu	

== A ==
English	Japanese	Rōmaji	TSE
Acom	アコム株式会社	Akomu Kabushiki-gaisha	TYO: 8572
Advantest	株式会社アドバンテスト	Kabushiki-gaisha Adobantesuto	TYO: 6857
Aeon	イオン株式会社	Ion Kabushiki-gaisha	TYO: 8267
AGC	AGC	Ei Jī Shī	TYO: 5201
Aichi Bank	株式会社愛知銀行	Kabushiki-gaisha Aichi Ginkō	TYO: 8527
Aichi Steel	愛知製鋼株式会社	Aichi Seikō Kabushiki-gaisha	TYO: 5482
Aiful	アイフル株式会社	Aifuru Kabushiki-gaisha	TYO: 8515
Aisin Seiki	アイシン精機株式会社	Aishin Seiki Kabushiki Kaisha	TYO: 7259
Aiwa	アイワ	Aiwa	
Ajinomoto	味の素株式会社	Ajinomoto Kabushiki-gaisha	TYO: 2802
Akai	赤井電機株式会社	Akai Denki Kabushiki-gaisha	
Akebono Brake Industry	曙ブレーキ工業株式会社	Akebono Burēki Kōgyō Kabushiki-gaisha	TYO: 7238
Akita Bank	株式会社秋田銀行	Kabushiki-gaisha Akita Ginkō	TYO: 8343
Alaxala Networks	アラクサラネットワークス株式会社	Arakusara Nettowākusu Kabushiki-gaisha	
All Nippon Airways	全日本空輸株式会社	Zen Nippon Kūyu Kabushiki Kaisha	TYO: 9202
Allied Telesis	アライドテレシスホールディングス株式会社	Araidotereshisu Hōrudingusu Kabushiki Kaisha	TYO: 6835
Alps Electric	アルプス電気株式会社	Arupusu Denki Kabushiki-gaisha	TYO: 6770
Alpine Electronics	アルパイン株式会社	Arupain Kabushiki-gaisha	TYO: 6816
ANEST IWATA	アネスト岩田株式会社	Anesuto Iwata Kabushiki-gaisha	TYO: 6381
Aniplex	株式会社アニプレックス	Kabushiki Kaisha Anipurekkusu	
Anritsu	アンリツ株式会社	Anritsu Kabushiki-gaisha	TYO: 6754
AnyColor	ANYCOLOR株式会社	Enīkarā Kabushiki-gaisha	TYO: 5032
AOC Holdings	AOCホールディングス株式会社	Eiōshī Hōrudingusu Kabushiki-gaisha	TYO: 5017
Aomori Bank	株式会社青森銀行	Kabushiki-gaisha Aomori Ginkō	TYO: 8342
Aoshima	青島文化教材社	Aoshima Bunka Kyozaisha	
Aoyagi Metals Company (Ayk)	青柳金属工業有限会社	Aoyagi Kinzoku Kōgyō Yūgen-gaisha	
Aozora Bank	あおぞら銀行	Aozora Ginkō	TYO: 8304
Arai Helmet Ltd.	株式会社アライヘルメット	Kabushiki-gaisha Arai Herumetto	
Arc System Works	アークシステムワークス	Āku Shisutemu Wākusu	
Aruze (Universal entertainment)	アルゼ株式会社	Aruze Kabushiki-gaisha	TYO: 6425
Asahi Breweries	アサヒビール株式会社	Asahi Bīru Kabushiki Gaisha	TYO: 2502
Asics	株式会社アシックス	Kabushiki-gaisha Ashikkusu	TYO: 7936
Asahi Kasei	旭化成株式会社	Asahi Kasei Kabushiki Kaisha	TYO: 3407
Asahi Shimbun	朝日新聞	Asahi Shinbun	
Astellas Pharma	アステラス製薬株式会社	Asuterasu Seiyaku Kabushiki-gaisha	TYO: 4503
Autobacs Seven Co.	株式会社オートバックスセブン	Kabushiki-gaisha Ōtobakksu Sebun	TYO: 9832
Audio-Technica	株式会社オーディオテクニカ	Kabushiki-gaisha Ōdio Tekunika	
Avex Group	エイベックス・グループ・ホールディングス株式会社	Eibekkusu Gurūpu Hōrudingusu Kabushiki-kaisha	TYO: 7860

== B ==
English	Japanese	Rōmaji	TSE
Baby, The Stars Shine Bright	株式会社 ベイビー、ザ スターズ シャイン ブライト	Kabushiki Kaisha Beibī, Za Sutāzu Shain Buraito	
Balmuda	バルミューダ株式会社	Barumyūda Kabushiki Kaisha	
Bandai	株式会社バンダイ	Kabushiki-gaisha Bandai	
Bandai Visual	バンダイビジュアル株式会社	Bandai Bijuaru Kabushiki Gaisha	
Namco Bandai Games	株式会社バンダイナムコゲームス	Kabushiki-gaisha Bandai Namuko Gēmusu	
Namco Bandai Holdings	株式会社バンダイナムコホールディングス	Kabushiki-gaisha Bandai Namuko Hōrudingusu	TYO: 7832
Bank of Iwate	株式会社岩手銀行	Kabushiki-gaisha Iwate Ginkō	TYO: 8345
Bank of Tokyo-Mitsubishi UFJ	株式会社三菱東京UFJ銀行	Kabushiki-gaisha Mitsubishi Tōkyō UFJ Ginkō	
Bank of Yokohama	横浜銀行	Yokohama Ginkō	TYO: 8332
A Bathing Ape	ア・ベイシング・エイプ	A Beishingu Eipu	
Best Denki	株式会社ベスト電器	Kabushiki-gaisha Besuto Denki	
Bones	株式会社ボンズ	Kabushiki Kaisha Bonzu	
Bridgestone	株式会社ブリヂストン	Kabushiki-gaisha Burijisuton	TYO: 5108
Brother Industries	ブラザー工業株式会社	Burazā Kōgyō Kabushiki-gaisha	TYO: 6448
Bungeishunjū	株式会社文藝春秋	Kabushiki-gaisha Bungei-shunju	
Bushiroad	株式会社ブシロード	Kabushiki-gaisha Bushirōdo	

== C ==
English	Japanese	Rōmaji	TSE
Calbee, Inc.	カルビー株式会社	Karubī Kabushiki-gaisha	TYO: 2229
Calsonic Kansei Corporation	カルソニックカンセイ株式会社	Karusonikku Kansei Kabushiki Gaisha	TYO: 7248
Canon	キヤノン株式会社	Kyanon Kabushiki Gaisha	TYO: 7751
Canon IT Solutions	キヤノンITソリューションズ株式会社	Kyanon Ai-Tī Soryūshonzu Kabushiki-gaisha	
Capcom	株式会社カプコン	Kabushiki-gaisha Kapukon	TYO: 9697
Casio	カシオ計算機株式会社	Kashio Keisanki Kabushiki-gaisha	TYO: 6952
CatEye	株式会社キャットアイ	Kabushiki-gaisha Kyaatoai	
Cave	株式会社ケイブ	Kabushiki-gaisha Keibu	TYO: 3760
Central Japan Railway Company	東海旅客鉄道株式会社	Tōkai Ryokaku Tetsudō Kabushiki-gaisha	TYO: 9022
Chiba Bank	株式会社千葉銀行	Kabushiki-gaisha Chiba Ginkō	TYO: 8331
Chisso	チッソ株式会社	Chisso Kabushiki Kaisha	
Chiyoda Corporation	千代田化工建設株式会社	Chiyoda Kakō Kensetsu Kabushiki-gaisha	TYO: 6366
Chizu Express	智頭急行	Chizu Kyūkō	
Chubu Electric Power	中部電力株式会社	Chūbu Denryoku Kabushiki-gaisha	TYO: 9502
Chugoku Electric Power	中国電力株式会社	Chūgoku Denryoku Kabushiki-gaisha	TYO: 9504
Chuokoron-Shinsha	株式会社中央公論新社	Kabushiki-gaisha Chūōkōron-shinsha	
Citizen	シチズン時計株式会社	Shichizun Tokei Kabushiki-gaisha	TYO: 7762
Comsys	コムシスホールディングス株式会社	Komushisu Hōrudingusu Kabushiki-gaisha	TYO: 1721
Cosmo Oil	コスモ石油株式会社	Kosumo Sekiyu Kabushiki-gaisha	TYO: 5007
Cospa	株式会社コスパ	Kabushiki-kaisha Kosupa	
Cover Corporation	カバー株式会社	Kabā Kabushiki-gaisha	TYO: 5253
Creators in Pack	株式会社クリエイターズインパック	Kabushiki-kaisha Kosupa	
Credit Saison	株式会社クレディセゾン	Kabushiki-gaisha Kuredi Sezon	TYO: 8253
CyberAgent	株式会社サイバーエージェント	Kabushiki-gaisha Saibāējento	TYO: 4751

== D ==
English	Japanese	Rōmaji	TSE
Dai-ichi Life	第一生命保険株式会社	Dai-ichi Seimei Hoken Kabushiki-kaisha	TYO: 8750
Dai Nippon Printing	大日本印刷株式会社	Dai Nippon Insatsu Kabushiki Kaisha	TYO: 7912
Daicel	株式会社 ダイセル	Kabushiki gaisha Daiseru	TYO: 4202
Daiei	株式会社ダイエー	Kabushiki-gaisha Daiē	TYO: 8263
Daifuku	株式会社ダイフク	Kabushiki-gaisha Daifuku	TYO: 6383
Daihatsu	ダイハツ工業株式会社	Daihatsu Kōgyō Kabushiki-gaisha	TYO: 7262
Daiichi Sankyo	第一三共株式会社	Daiichi Sankyō Kabushiki-gaisha	TYO: 4568
Daikin Industries	ダイキン工業株式会社	Daikin Kōgyō Kabushiki-gaisha	TYO: 6367
Daikyo	株式会社大京	Kabushiki-gaisha Daikyō	TYO: 8840
Daimaru	株式会社大丸	Kabushiki-gaisha Daimaru	TYO: 8234
Dainippon Sumitomo Pharma	大日本住友製薬株式会社	Dainippon Sumitomo Seiyaku Kabushiki-gaisha	TYO: 4506
Daiso	株式会社大創産業	Kabushikigaisha Daisōsangyō	
Daiwa House Industry	大和ハウス工業	Daiwa Hausu Kōgyō	TYO: 1925
Daiwa Securities	大和証券グループ本社	Daiwa Shōken Gurūpu Honsha	TYO: 8601
Denka	デンカ株式会社	Denka Kabushiki-gaisha	TYO: 4061
Denon	株式会社デノン	Kabushiki Kaisha Denon	
Denso	株式会社デンソー	Kabushiki-gaisha Densō	TYO: 6902
Dentsu	株式会社電通	Kabushiki-gaisha Dentsū	TYO: 4324
Descente	株式会社デサント	Kabushiki-gaisha Desanto	TYO: 8114
Digital Frontier	株式会社デジタル・フロンティア	Kabushiki-gaisha Digital Frontier	
DIC Corp. (formerly Dainippon Ink & Chemicals)	DIC株式会社	DIC Kabushiki-gaisha	TYO: 4631
Disco Corporation	株式会社ディスコ	Kabushiki-gaisha Disuko	TYO: 6146
DigiOn	デジオン	Diji-on	
DMG Mori Seiki	DMG森精機株式会社	DMG Mori Seiki Kabushiki-gaisha	TYO: 6141
Dome	株式会社童夢	Kabushiki Kaisha Dōmu	
Don Quijote	株式会社ドン・キホーテ	Kabushiki gaisha Don Kihōte	
Dowa Holdings	DOWAホールディングス株式会社	DOWA Hōrudingusu Kabushiki-gaisha	TYO: 5714
Dwango	株式会社ドワンゴ	Kabushiki-gaisha Dowango	
Dynic Corporation	ダイニック株式会社	Dainikku Kabushiki-gaisha	TYO: 3551

== E ==
English	Japanese	Rōmaji	TSE
East Japan Railway Company	東日本旅客鉄道株式会社	Higashi-Nihon Ryokaku Tetsudō Kabushiki-gaisha	TYO: 9020
Ebara Corporation	荏原製作所	Kabushiki-gaisha Ebara Seisakusho	TYO: 6361
Eiken Chemical	栄研化学株式会社	Eiken Kagaku Kabushiki-gaisha	TYO: 4549
Eisai	エーザイ株式会社	Ēzai Kabushiki-gaisha	TYO: 4523
Eizo	EIZO株式会社	EIZO Kabushiki-gaisha	TYO: 6737
Electric Power Development Company	電源開発株式会社	Dengen Kaihatsu Kabushiki-gaisha	TYO: 9513
Enkei Corporation	エンケイ株式会社	Enkei Kabushiki-gaisha	
Ezaki Glico	江崎グリコ株式会社	Ezaki Guriko Kabushiki-gaisha	TYO: 2206
Eco Marine Power			

== F ==
English	Japanese	Rōmaji	TSE
Falken Tires; See Sumitomo Rubber Industries	ファルケン 住友ゴム工業株式会社	Faruken; Sumitomo Gomu-kōgyō Kabushiki-gaisha	
Family Inada	ファミリーイナダ株式会社	Famirī Inada Kabushiki-gaisha	
FamilyMart	株式会社ファミリーマート	Kabushiki gaisha Famirīmāto	
FANCL Corporation	株式会社ファンケル	Kabushiki gaisha Fankeru	TYO: 4921
Fanuc	ファナック株式会社	Fanakku Kabushiki-gaisha	TYO: 6954
Fast Retailing	ファーストリテイリング	Fāsuto Riteiringu	TYO: 9983
Fenrir Inc	フェンリル株式会社	Fenrir Kabushiki-gaisha	
Fernandes Guitars	フェルナンデス		
Fostex	フォスター電機		
Fuji Electric	富士電機ホールディングス株式会社	Fuji Denki Hōrudhingsu Kabushiki-gaisha	TYO: 6504
Fuji Fire and Marine Insurance	富士火災海上保険	Fuji Kasai Kaijō Hoken	TYO: 8763
Fuji Heavy Industries	富士重工業株式会社	Fuji Jūkōgyō Kabushiki-gaisha	TYO: 7270
Fuji Media Holdings, Inc.	株式会社フジ・メディア・ホールディングス	Kabushiki-gaisha Fuji Media Hōrudingusu	
Fuji Xerox Co., Ltd.	富士ゼロックス株式会社	Fuji Zerokkusu Kabushiki-gaisha	
Fujifilm	富士フイルム株式会社	Fujifirumu Kabushiki Kaisha	
Fujimitsu Corporation	フジミツ株式会社	Fujimitsu Kabushiki-gaisha	
Fujitec	フジテック株式会社	Fujitekku Kabushiki-gaisha	
Fuji Television	株式会社フジテレビジョン	Kabushiki Gaisha Fuji Terebijon	TYO: 4676
Fujitsu	富士通株式会社	Fujitsū Kabushiki-gaisha	TYO: 6702
Fukushima Galilei	フクシマガリレイ		TYO: 6420
Funai	船井電機株式会社	Funai Denki Kabushiki-gaisha	TYO: 6839
Furukawa Electric	古河電気工業	Furukawa Denki Kōgyō	TYO: 5801
Furuno	古野電気株式会社	Furuno Denki Kabushiki-gaisha	TYO: 6814
Futaba Corporation	双葉電子工業株式会社	Futaba Denshi Kōgyō Kabushiki-gaisha	TYO: 6986

== G ==
English	Japanese	Rōmaji	TSE
Gainax	株式会社ガイナックス	Kabushiki-gaisha Gainakkusu	
Gakken	株式会社学研ホールディングス	Kabushiki-gaisha Gakken Hōrudingusu	TYO: 9470
GEOS	株式会社ジオス	Kabushiki-gaisha Jiosu	
Globeride	グローブライド株式会社	Gurōburaido Kabushiki-gaisha	TYO: 7990
GS Yuasa	株式会社ジーエス・ユアサ コーポレーション	Kabushiki-gaisha GS Yuasa Kōporēshon	TYO: 6674
Gonzo	株式会社ゴンゾ	Kabushiki-gaisha Gonzo	
Genista Corporation			
GungHo Online Entertainment	ガンホー・オンライン・エンターテイメント株式会社	Ganhō Onrain Entāteimento Kabushiki-gaish	
GrapeCity			

== H ==
English	Japanese	Rōmaji	TSE
H_{2}O Retailing	エイチ・ツー・オー リテイリング株式会社	Eichi Tsū Ō Riteiringu Kabushiki-gaisha	TYO: 8242
Hamamatsu Photonics	浜松ホトニクス株式会社	Hamamatsu Hotonikusu Kabushiki-gaisha	TYO: 6965
Hankyu Hanshin Holdings	阪急阪神ホールディングス株式会社	Hankyū Hanshin Hōrudingusu Kabushiki-gaisha	TYO: 9042
Hankyu Railway	阪急電鉄	Hankyū Dentetsu	
Hanshin Electric Railway	阪神電気鉄道株式会社	Hanshin Denki-tetsudō Kabushiki-gaisha	
Hasegawa	株式会社ハセガワ	Kabushiki Kaisha Hasegawa	
Haseko	株式会社長谷工コーポレーション	Kabushiki-gaisha Hasekō Kōporēshon	TYO: 1808
Hazama Ando	株式会社安藤・間	Andō Hazama Kabushiki-gaisha	TYO: 1719
HI-LEX	株式会社ハイレックスコーポレーション	Hairekkusu Kōporēshon Kabushiki-gaisha	TYO: 7279
Hirobo	ヒロボー株式会社	Hirobō kabushiki-gaisha	
Hirose Electric	ヒロセ電機株式会社	Hirose Denki kabushiki-gaisha	TYO: 6806
Hisamitsu Pharmaceutical	久光製薬株式会社	Hisamitsu Seiyaku Kabusiki-gaisha	TYO: 4530
Hitachi	株式会社日立製作所	Kabushiki-gaisha Hitachi Seisakusho	TYO: 6501
HKS	株式会社エッチ・ケー・エス	Kabushiki-gaisha Ecchi Kē Esu	TYO: 7219
Hokkaidō Electric Power	北海道電力	Hokkaidō Denryoku	TYO: 9509
Hokkaido Railway Company	北海道旅客鉄道株式会社	Hokkaidō Ryokaku Tetsudō Kabushiki-gaisha	
Hokkoku Bank	株式会社北國銀行	Kabushiki Kaisha Hokkoku Ginkō	TYO: 8363
Hokuetsu Corporation	北越コーポレーション株式会社	Hokuetsu Kōporēshon Kabushiki-gaisha	TYO: 3865
Hokuriku Electric Power Company	北陸電力	Hokuriku Denryoku	TYO: 9505
Hokuriku Bank	株式会社北陸銀行	Kabushiki-gaisha Hokoriku Ginkō	
Hokuto Bank	株式会社北都銀行	Kabushiki Kaisha Hokuto Ginkō	
Honda	本田技研工業株式会社	Honda Giken Kōgyō Kabushiki-gaisha	TYO: 7267
Horiba	株式会社堀場製作所	Kabushiki Kaisha Horiba Seisakusho	TYO: 6856
Horipuro	株式会社ホリプロ	Kabushiki Kaisha Horipuro	TYO: 9667
Hoshino Gakki	星野楽器株式会社	Hoshino Gakki Kabushiki-gaisha	
Hosiden	ホシデン株式会社	Hoshiden Kabushiki Kaisha	TYO: 6804
House Foods	ハウス食品グループ本社株式会社	Hausushokuhin Gurūpu Honsha Kabushiki-gaisha	TYO: 2810
Howa Machinery	豊和工業株式会社	Howa Kogyo Kabusiki-gaisya	TYO: 6203
Hoya Corporation	HOYA株式会社	Hoya Kabushiki Kaisha	TYO: 7741
Human Entertainment	ヒューマン株式会社	Hyūman Kabushiki-gaisha	

== I ==
English	Japanese	Rōmaji	TSE
Ibanez	アイバニーズ	Aibanīzu	
Ibiden	イビデン株式会社	Ibiden Kabushiki-kaisha	TYO: 4062
Icom	アイコム株式会社	Aikomu Kabushiki-gaisha	TYO: 6820
Idea Factory	アイディアファクトリー株式会社	Aidia Fakutorī Kabushiki-gaisha	
Idemitsu Kosan	出光興産株式会社	Idemitsu Kōsan Kabushiki-gaisha	TYO: 5019
IHI Corporation formerly Ishikawajima-Harima	株式会社IHI	Kabushiki-gaisha IHI	TYO: 7013
Impul	株式会社ホシノインパル	Kabushiki-gaisha Impul	
Imperial Hotel	株式会社帝国ホテル	Kabushiki-gaisha Teikoku Hoteru	
Index Corporation	株式会社インデックス	Kabushiki-gaisha Indekkusu	
Inpex	国際石油開発帝石株式会社	Kokusai Sekiyu Kaihatsu Teiseki Kabushiki-gaisha	TYO: 1605
Irem	アイレムソフトウェアエンジニアリング株式会社	Airemu Sofutowea Enjiniaringu Kabushiki-gaisha	
Iris Ohyama	アイリスオーヤマ株式会社	Airisu-Ōyama Kabushiki-gaisha	
Iseki	井関農機株式会社	Iseki Nōki Kabushiki-gaisha	TYO: 6310
Isetan	株式会社伊勢丹	Kabushiki-gaisha Isetan	TYO: 8238
Ishida	株式会社 イシダ	Kabushiki-gaisha Ishida	
Isuzu	いすゞ自動車株式会社	Isuzu Jidōsha Kabushiki-gaisha	TYO: 7202
Ito-Yokado	株式会社イトーヨーカ堂	Kabushiki-gaisha Itō Yōkadō	
Itochu formerly C. Itoh & Co.	伊藤忠商事株式会社	Itōchū Shōji Kabushiki-gaisha	TYO: 8001
Itochu Techno-Solutions	伊藤忠テクノソリューションズ株式会社	Itōchū Tekuno-soryūshonzu Kabushiki-gaisha	TYO: 4739
Iwataya Mitsukoshi	株式会社岩田屋三越	Kabushiki-gaisha Iwataya Mitsukoshi	
Izumiya	イズミヤ株式会社	Izumiya Kabushiki-gaisha	

== J ==
English	Japanese	Rōmaji	TSE
Jaleco	株式会社ジャレコ	Kabushiki Kaisha Ja-Re-ko	
JAL Infotec	株式会社JALインフォテック	Kabushiki-gaisha Jaru Infotekku	
Janome	蛇の目ミシン工業株式会社	Janome Mishin Kōgyō Kabushiki-gaisha	TYO: 6445
Japan Airlines	日本航空株式会社	Nihon Kōkū Kabushiki-gaisha	TYO: 9205
Japan Display	株式会社ジャパンディスプレイ	Kabushiki-gaisha Japan Disupurei	TYO: 6740
Japan Credit Bureau	株式会社ジェーシービー	Kabushiki-gaisha Jē Shī Bī	
Japan Freight Railway Company	日本貨物鉄道株式会社	Nippon Kamotsu Tetsudō Kabushiki-gaisha	
Japan Post Bank	株式会社ゆうちょ銀行	Kabushiki-gaisha Yūcho Ginkō	
Japan Post Holdings	日本郵政株式会社	Nippon Yūsei Kabushiki-gaisha	TYO: 6178
Japan Post Insurance	株式会社かんぽ生命保険	Kabushiki-gaisha Kanpo Seimeihoken	
Japan Post	日本郵便株式会社	Nippon Yū-bin Kabushiki-gaisha	
Japan Radio Company	日本無線株式会社	Nihon Musen Kabushiki-gaisha	TYO: 6751
Japan Remote Control	日本遠隔制御株式会社	Nihon Enkaku Seigyo Kabushiki Gaisha	
Japan Tobacco	日本たばこ産業株式会社	Nihon Tabako Sangyō Kabushiki-gaisha	TYO: 2914
JAPEX	石油資源開発株式会社	Sekiyu Shigen Kaihatsu Kabushiki-Kaisha	TYO: 1662
JEOL	日本電子株式会社	Nihon Denshi Kabushiki-gaisha	TYO: 6951
JFE Holdings	ジェイエフイーホールディングス株式会社	Jeiefuī Hōrudingusu Kabushiki-gaisha	TYO: 5411
JGC Corporation	日揮株式会社	Nikki Kabushiki-gaisha	TYO: 1963
Joyo Bank	株式会社常陽銀行	Jōyō Ginkō Kabushiki Kaisha	TYO: 8333
JTB Corporation	株式会社ジェイテクト	Kabushiki-gaisha Jeitībī	
JTEKT	株式会社ジェイティービー	Kabushiki-gaisha Jeitekuto	TYO: 6473
JUKI Corporation	JUKI株式会社	JUKI Kabushiki Kaisha	TYO: 6440
JUN Auto; Tanaka Industrial Co., Ltd.	田中工業株式会社	Tanaka Kōgyō Kabushiki Kaisha	
JVC (Victor Company of Japan, Ltd.)	日本ビクター株式会社	Nippon Bikutā Kabushiki-gaisha	TYO: 6792
JVCKenwood	株式会社JVCケンウッド	Kabushiki-gaisha JVC Ken'uddo	
JustSystems	株式会社ジャストシステム	Kabushiki-gaisha Jasuto-Shisutemu	TYO: 4686

== K ==
English	Japanese	Rōmaji	TSE
Kabaya	カバヤ食品株式会社	Kabaya Shokuhin Kabushiki-gaisha	
K Line	川崎汽船株式会社	Kawasaki Kisen Kabushiki-gaisha	TYO: 9107
Kadokawa Corporation	株式会社KADOKAWA	Kabushiki-gaisha Kadokawa	
Kadokawa Dwango Corporation	カドカワ株式会社	Kadokawa Kabushiki-gaisha	
Kadokawa Shoten	株式会社角川書店	Kabushiki-gaisha Kadokawa Shoten	
Kagome	カゴメ株式会社	Kagome Kabushiki-gaisha	TYO: 2811
Kajima Construction	鹿島建設株式会社	Kajima Kensetsu Kabushiki Kaisha	TYO: 1812
Kaneka Corporation	株式会社カネカ	Kabushiki-gaisha Kaneka	TYO: 4118
Kanesue	株式会社カネスエ	Kabushiki Kaisha Kanesue	
Kansai Electric Power Company	関西電力株式会社	Kansai Denryoku Kabushiki-gaisha	TYO: 9503
Kansai Paint	関西ペイント株式会社	Kansai Peinto Kabushiki-gaisha	TYO: 4613
Kao Corporation	花王株式会社	Kaō Kabushiki-gaisha	TYO: 4452
Kawai Musical Instruments	株式会社河合楽器製作所	Kabushiki-gaisha Kawai Gakkiseisakusho	TYO: 7952
Kawasaki Heavy Industries	川崎重工業株式会社	Kawasaki Jūkōgyō Kabushiki-gaisha	TYO: 7012
Kawasaki Motors	カワサキモータース	Kawasaki Mōtāsu Kabushikigaisha	
KDDI	KDDI株式会社	Keidīdīai Kabushiki Kaisha	TYO: 9433
Keihin Corporation	株式会社ケーヒン	Kabushiki-gaisha Keihin	TYO: 7251
Keihin Electric Express Railway	京浜急行電鉄株式会社	Keihin Kyūkō Dentetsu Kabushiki-gaisha	TYO: 9006
Keio Corporation	京王電鉄株式会社	Keiō Dentetsu Kabushiki-gaisha	TYO: 9008
Keisei Electric Railway	京成電鉄株式会社	Keisei Dentetsu Kabushiki-gaisha	
Kenwood Electronics	株式会社ケンウッド	Kabushiki-gaisha Kenuddo	TYO: 6765
Keyence	株式会社キーエンス	Kabushiki-gaisha Kīensu	TYO: 6861
Kikkoman	キッコーマン株式会社	Kikkōman Kabushiki-gaisha	TYO: 2801
Kintetsu Group	近鉄グループホールディングス	Kintetsu gurūpu hōrudeingusu kabushiki gaisha	TYO: 9041
Kirin Company	キリン株式会社	Kirin Kabushiki-gaisha	
Kita-Osaka Kyuko Railway	北大阪急行電鉄株式会社	Kita Ōsaka Kyūkō Dentetsu Kabushiki Kaisha	
Kobe Electric Railway	神戸電鉄株式会社	Kōbe Dentetsu Kabushiki Kaisha	TYO: 9046
Kobe New Transit	神戸新交通株式会社	Kōbe Shinkōtsū Kabushiki Kaisha	
Kobe Steel	株式会社神戸製鋼所	Kabushiki-gaisha Kōbe Seikō-sho	TYO: 5406
Kodansha	株式会社講談社	Kabushiki-gaisha Kōdansha	
Koei	株式会社コーエー	Kabushiki-gaisha Kōē	
Komatsu Limited	株式会社小松製作所	Kabushiki-gaisha Komatsu Seisakusho	TYO: 6301
Komori	株式会社小森コーポレーション	Kabushiki-gaisha Komori kōporēshon	TYO: 6349
Konami	コナミ株式会社	Konami Kabushiki-gaisha	TYO: 9766
Kondo Kagaku	近藤科学株式会社	Kondo Kagaku	
Kongō Gumi	株式会社金剛組	Kabushiki Gaisha Kongō Gumi	
Konica Minolta	コニカミノルタホールディングス	Konika Minoruta Hōrudingusu	TYO: 4902
Korg	株式会社コルグ	Kabushiki-gaisha Korugu	
KOSÉ	株式会社コーセー	Kabushiki-kaisha Kōsē	TYO: 4922
Kubota	株式会社クボタ	Kabushiki-gaisha Kubota	TYO: 6326
Kumagai Gumi	株式会社熊谷組	Kabushiki-gaisha Kumagai Gumi	TYO: 1861
Kumon	株式会社日本公文教育研究会	Kabushiki-gaisha Nihon Kōbun Kyōiku Kenkyūkai	
Kuraray	株式会社クラレ	Kabushiki-gaisha Kurare	TYO: 3405
Kureha Corporation	株式会社クレハ	Kabushiki-gaisha Kureha	TYO: 4023
Kuretake	株式会社呉竹	Kabushiki-gaisha Kuretake	
Kurita Water Industries	栗田工業株式会社	Kurita Kōgyō Kabushiki-gaisha	TYO: 6370
Kyocera	栗田工業株式会社	Kyōsera Kabushiki-gaisha	TYO: 6971
KYB Corporation	カヤバ工業株式会社	Kayaba Kogyo Kabushiki-gaisha	TYO: 7242
Kyosho	京商株式会社	Kyōshō Kabushiki Kaisha	
Kyushu Electric Power	九州電力株式会社	Kyūshū Denryoku Kabushiki Kaisha	TYO: 9508
Kyushu Railway Company	九州旅客鉄道株式会社	Kyūshū Ryokaku Tetsudō Kabushiki-gaisha	

== L ==
English	Japanese	Rōmaji	TSE
Lawson	株式会社ローソン	Kabushiki Kaisha Rōson	
Lion Corporation	ライオン株式会社	Raion Kabushiki-gaisha	TYO: 4912
Livedoor	株式会社ライブドア	Kabushiki-gaisha Raibudoa	
LIXIL Group Corporation	LIXILグループ株式会社	LIXIL Gurūpu kabushiki-kaisha	TYO: 5938

== M ==
English	Japanese	Rōmaji	TSE
Mabuchi Motor	マブチモーター株式会社	Mabuchi Mōtā Kabushiki Kaisha	TYO: 6592
Maeda Corporation	前田建設工業株式会社	Maeda Kensetsu Kōgyō Kabushiki Kaisha	TYO: 1824
Makino	株式会社牧野フライス製作所	Kabushiki-gaisha Makino Furaisu Seisakusho	TYO: 6135
Makita	株式会社マキタ	Kabushiki Kaisha Makita	TYO: 6586
Mandom	株式会社マンダム	Kabushiki-gaisha Mandamu	TYO: 4917
Marubeni	丸紅株式会社	Marubeni Kabushiki-gaisha	TYO: 8002
Maruhon	マルホン工業株式会社	Kabushiki Kaisha Maruhon Kōgyō	
Marui	株式会社丸井	Kabushiki-gaisha Marui	TYO: 8252
Marukome	マルコメ株式会社	Marukome Kabushiki-gaisha	
Marvelous	株式会社マーベラス	Kabushiki gaisha Māberasu	
Matsuura Machinery	株式会社松浦機械製作所	Kabushiki-gaisha Matsuura Kikai Seisakusho	
Mazda	マツダ株式会社	Matsuda Kabushiki-kaisha	TYO: 7261
Mazdaspeed	マツダスピード	Matsudasupiido	
Media Create	株式会社メディアクリエイト	Kabushiki Gaisha Media Kurieito	
Meidensha	株式会社明電舎	Kabushiki-gaisha Meidensha	TYO: 6508
Meiji Holdings	明治ホールディングス株式会社	Meiji Hōrudingusu Kabushiki-gaisha	TYO: 2269
Meiji Dairies	明治乳業株式会社	Meiji Nyūgyō Kabushiki-gaisha	
Meiji Seika	明治製菓株式会社	Meiji Seika Kabushiki-gaisha	
Meiji Yasuda Life Insurance	明治安田生命保険相互会社	Meiji Yasuda Seimei Hoken Sōgo Kaisha	
Melco Holdings Inc. Well known for Buffalo, Inc.	株式会社メルコホールディングス	Kabushiki-gaisha Meruko Hōrudingusu	
Metropolitan Intercity Railway Company	首都圏新都市鉄道株式会社	Shuto-ken Shin Toshi Tetsudō Kabushiki-gaisha	
Michinoku Bank	株式会社みちのく銀行	Kabushiki-gaisha Michinoku Ginkō	TYO: 8350
Mikasa Corporation; Also known by the name Mikasa Sports.	株式会社 ミカサ	Kabushiki Kaisha Mikasa	
Millea Holdings	株式会社ミレアホールディングス	Kabushiki-gaisha Mirea Hōrudingusu	TYO: 8766
MINE'S	株式会社マインズ	Kabushiki-gaisha Mainzu	
Ministop	ミニストップ株式会社	Minisutoppu Kabushiki-gaisha	
Mister Donut	ミスタードーナツ	Misutā Dōnatsu	
Mitsuba	株式会社ミツバ	Kabushiki-gaisha MITSUBA	TYO: 7280
Mitsubishi	三菱グループ	Mitsubishi Gurūpu	
Mitsubishi Motors	三菱自動車工業株式会社	Mitsubishi Jidōsha Kōgyō Kabushiki Kaisha	TYO: 7211
Mitsubishi Chemical	三菱化学株式会社	Mitsubishi Kagaku Kabushiki-gaisha	
Mitsubishi Corporation	三菱商事株式会社	Mitsubishi Shōji Kabushiki Kaisha	TYO: 8058
Mitsubishi Electric	三菱電機株式会社	Mitsubishi Denki Kabushiki-gaisha	TYO: 6503
Mitsubishi Estate	三菱地所株式会社	Mitsubishi Jisho Kabushiki-gaisha	TYO: 8802
Mitsubishi Gas Chemical	三菱ガス化学	Mitsubishi Gasu Kagaku	TYO: 4182
Mitsubishi Heavy Industries	三菱重工業株式會社	Mitsubishi Jūkōgyō Kabushiki Kaisha	TYO: 7011
Mitsubishi Materials	三菱マテリアル株式会社	Mitsubishi Materiaru Kabushiki Kaisha	TYO: 5711
Mitsubishi Pencil	三菱鉛筆株式会社	Mitsubishi Enpitsu Kabushiki Kaisha	TYO: 7976
Mitsubishi UFJ Financial Group	株式会社三菱UFJフィナンシャル・グループ	Kabushiki-gaisha Mitsubishi Yūefujei Finansharu Gurūpu	TYO: 8306
Mitsubishi UFJ Trust and Banking Corporation	三菱UFJ信託銀行株式会社	Mitsubishi Yūefujei Shintaku Ginkō Kabushiki-gaisha	
Mitsubishi UFJ Securities	三菱UFJ証券株式会社	Mitsubishi UFJ Shōken Kabushiki Kaisha	TYO: 8615
Mitsui	三井グループ	Mitsui Gurūpu	
Mitsui Bussan	三井物産株式会社	Mitsui Bussan Kabushiki Kaisha	TYO: 8031
Mitsui Chemicals	三井化学株式会社	Mitsui Kagaku Kabushiki Kaisha	TYO: 4183
Mitsui E&S	三井造船株式会社	Mitsui Sōsen Kabushiki Kaisha	TYO: 7003
Mitsui Fudosan	三井不動産株式会社	Mitsui Fudōsan Kabushiki-gaisha	TYO: 8801
Mitsui Knowledge Industry	三井情報株式会社	Mitsui Jōhō Kabushiki-gaisha	
Mitsui O.S.K. Lines	株式会社商船三井	Kabushiki-gaisha Shōsen Mitsui	TYO: 9104
Mitsui Sumitomo Insurance	三井住友海上火災保険株式会社	Mitsui Sumitomo Kaijō Kasai Hoken Kabushiki Kaisha	TYO: 8752
Mitsui Trust Holdings	三井トラスト・ホールディングス株式会社	Mitsui Torasuto Hōrudingusu Kabushiki-gaisha	TYO: 8309
Mitsukoshi	株式会社三越	Kabushiki-gaisha Mitsukoshi	TYO: 2779
Mitsumi Electric	ミツミ電機株式会社	Mitsumi Denki Kabushiki-gaisha	TYO: 6767
Mitsuoka Motor	株式会社光岡自動車	Kabushiki-gaisha Mitsuoka Jidōsha	
Mitutoyo	株式会社ミツトヨ	Kabushiki-gaisha Mitutoyo	
Miyata	株式会社ミヤタサイクル	Kabushiki-gaisha Miyata Saikuru	
Mizkan	株式会社Mizkan Holdings	Kabushiki-gaisha Mizkan Holdings	
Mizuho Financial Group	株式会社みずほフィナンシャルグループ	Kabushiki-gaisha Mizuho Finansharu Gurūpu	TYO: 8411
Mizuho Bank	株式会社みずほ銀行	Kabushiki-gaisha Mizuho Ginkō	
Mizuho Corporate Bank	式会社みずほコーポレート銀行	Kabushiki-gaisha Mizuho Kōporēto Ginkō	
Mizuho Trust & Banking	みずほ信託銀行株式会社	Mizuho Shintaku Ginkō Kabushiki-gaisha	TYO: 8404
Mizuho Information & Research Institute	みずほ情報総研株式会社	Mizuho Jōhō Sōken Kabushiki Kaisha	
Mizuno Corporation	ミズノ株式会社	Mizuno Kabushiki-gaisha	TYO: 8022
MODEC	三井海洋開発株式会社	Mitsui Kaiyōkaihatsu Kabushiki-gaisha	TYO: 6269
Molten Corporation	株式会社モルテン	Kabushiki-gaisha Moruten	
Moodyz	MOODYZ	Mūdīzu	
Morinaga & Company	森永製菓株式会社	Morinaga Seika Kabushiki-gaisha	TYO: 2201
Moriwaki	株式会社モリワキエンジニアリング	Kabushiki-gaisha Moriwaki Enjiniaringu	
Morozoff	モロゾフ株式会社	Morozofu Kabushiki-gaisha	TYO: 2217
Mugen Motorsports	株式会社M-TEC	Kabushiki Kaisha M-TEC	
Mugen Seiki	株式会社無限精機	Kabushiki Kaisha Mugen Seiki	
Muji	株式会社良品計画	Kabushiki-gaisha Ryōhin Keikaku	TYO: 7453
Murata Machinery	村田機械株式会社	Murata Kikai Kabushiki-gaisha	
Murata Manufacturing	株式会社村田製作所	Kabushiki-gaisha Murata Seisakusho	TYO: 6981

== N ==
English	Japanese	Rōmaji	TSE
Nabtesco	ナブテスコ株式会社	Nabutesuko Kabushiki-gaisha	TYO: 6268
Nachi-Fujikoshi	株式会社不二越	Kabushiki-gaisha Fujikoshi	TYO: 6474
Nagoya Railroad	名古屋鉄道株式会社	Nagoya Tetsudō Kabushiki-gaisha	TYO: 9048
Nakajima Aircraft Company (early 20th century)	中島飛行機株式会社	Nakajima Hikōki Kabushiki Kaisha	
Nakano Corporation	株式会社ナカノフドー建設	Kabushiki-kaisha Nakano Fudo Kensetsu	TYO: 1827
Namco	株式会社ナムコ	Kabushiki-gaisha Namuko	
Nankai Electric Railway	南海電気鉄道株式会社	Nankai Denki Tetsudō Kabushiki-gaisha	TYO: 9044
Nanto Bank	南都銀行	Nanto Ginkō	TYO: 8367
NHK	日本放送協会	Nippon Hōsō Kyōkai	
NHK Spring	日本発条株式会社	Nippon Hatsujō Kabushiki-gaisha	TYO: 5991
Nichia	日亜化学工業株式会社	Nichikon Kabushiki-gaisha	
Nichicon	ニチコン株式会社	Nichikon Kabushiki-gaisha	TYO: 6996
Nichirei	株式会社ニチレイ	Kabushiki-gaisha Nichirei	TYO: 2871
Nidec	日本電産株式会社	Nihon Densan Kabushiki-gaisha	TYO: 6594
Nihon Dempa Kogyo	日本電波工業株式会社	Nihon Dempa Kogyo Kabushiki-gaisha	TYO: 6779
Nihon Kohden	日本光電工業株式会社	Nihon Kōdenkōgyō Kabushiki-gaisha	TYO: 6849
Nippon Broadcasting System	ニッポン放送	Kabushiki-gaisha Nippon Hōsō	
NEC	日本電気株式会社	Nippon Denki Kabushiki Gaisha	TYO: 6701
Nichibutsu	日本物産株式会社	Nihon Bussan Kabushiki-gaisha	
Nikken Sekkei	株式会社日建設計	Kabushiki-gaisha Nikken Sekkei	
Nikko Ceramics	ニッコー株式会社	Nikkō Kabushiki-gaisha	NAG: 5343
Nikko Cordial	株式会社日興コーディアルグループ	Kabushiki-gaisha Nikkō Kōdhiaru Gurūpu	TYO: 8603
Nikon	株式会社ニコン	Nikon Kabushiki-gaisha	TYO: 7731
Nintendo	任天堂株式会社	Nintendō Kabushiki-gaisha	TYO: 7974
Nippon Cable	日本ケーブル株式会社	Nihon Kēburu Kabushiki-gaisha	
Nippon Chemi-Con	日本ケミコン株式会社	Nippon Kemikon Kabushiki-gaisha	TYO: 6997
Nippon Electric Glass	日本電気硝子株式会社	Nihon Denki Garasu Kabushiki-gaisha	TYO: 5214
Nippon Express	日本通運株式会社	Nippon Tsū-un Kabushiki-gaisha	TYO: 9062
Nippon Flour Mills	日本製粉株式会社	Nihon Seifun Kabushiki-gaisha	TYO: 2001
Nippon Kayaku	日本生命保険相互会社	Nihon Kayaku Kabushiki-gaisha	TYO: 4272
Nippon Life	日本軽金属株式会社	Nihon Seimei Hoken Sōgo-gaisha	
Nippon Light Metal	日本軽金属株式会社	Nippon Kei-Kinzoku Kabushiki-gaisha	TYO: 5701
Nippon Meat Packers	日本ハム株式会社	Nippon Hamu Kabushiki-gaisha	TYO: 2282
Nippon Mining	日鉱金属株式会社	Nikkō Kinzoku Kabushiki-gaisha	
Nippon Oil	新日本石油株式会社	Shin Nihon Sekiyu Kabushiki-gaisha	TYO: 5001
Nippon Paint	日本ペイントホールディングス株式会社	Nihon Peinto Hōrudingusu Kabushiki-kaisha	TYO: 4612
Nippon Paper Industries	日本製紙グループ株式会社	Nihon Seishi Gurūpu Kabushiki-gaisha	TYO: 3863
Nippon Sheet Glass	日本板硝子株式会社	Nihon Ita-Garasu Kabushiki-gaisha	TYO: 5202
Nippon Shinpan see Mitsubishi UFJ Financial Group			
Nippon Soda	日本曹達株式会社	Nihonsōda Kabushiki-kaisha	TYO: 4041
Nippon Steel Corporation	新日鐵住金株式会社	Shinnittetsu Sumikin Kabushiki-gaisha	TYO: 5401
Nippon Steel Trading	日鐵商事	Nittetsu Shōji	TYO: 9810
Nippon TV Network	日本テレビ放送網株式会社	Nihon Terebi Hōsōmō Kabushiki-gaisha	TYO: 9404
Nippon Yusen	日本郵船株式会社	Nippon Yūsen Kabushiki-gaisha	TYO: 9101
Nipro	ニプロ株式会社	Nipro Kabushiki-gaisha	TYO: 8086
Nismo aka Nissan Motorsport International	ニッサン・モータースポーツ・インターナショナル株式会社	Nissan Mōtā Supōtsu Intānashonaru Kabushiki Kaisha	
Nissan Chemical Corporation	日産化学株式会社	Nissan Kagaku Kabushiki-gaisha	TYO: 4021
Nissan Motors	日産自動車株式会社	Nissan Jidōsha Kabushiki-gaisha	TYO: 7201
Nisshin Steel	日新製鋼株式会社	Nisshin Seikō Kabushiki-gaisha	TYO: 5407
Nisshinbo Holdings	日清紡ホールディングス株式会社	Nisshinbō Hōrudingusu Kabushiki-gaisha	TYO: 3105
Nissin Electric	日新電機株式会社	Nisshin Denki Kabushiki-gaisha	TYO: 6641
Nissin Foods	日清食品株式会社	Nisshin Shokuhin Kabushiki-gaisha	TYO: 2897
Nissin Kogyo	日信工業株式会社	Nisshin Kōgyō Kabushiki-gaisha	TYO: 7230
Nitto Boseki	日東紡績株式会社	Nittō Bōseki Kabushiki-gaisha	TYO: 3110
Nitto Denko	日東電工株式会社	Nittō Denkō Kabushiki-gaisha	TYO: 6988
NKK Switches	NKKスイッチズ株式会社	NKK Suitchizu Kabushiki-gaisha	JASDAQ: 6943
Nomura Holdings	野村ホールディングス株式会社	Nomura Hōrudingusu Kabushiki-gaisha	TYO: 8604
Nomura Securities	野村證券株式会社	Nomura Shōken Kabushiki-gaisha	
Nomura Research Institute	野村総合研究所	Nomura Sōgō Kenkyūjo	TYO: 4307
Noritake	株式会社ノリタケカンパニーリミテド	Kabushiki-gaisha Noritake Kanpanī Rimitedo	TYO: 5331
Nose Railway	能勢電鉄株式会社	Nose Dentetsu Kabushiki-gaisha	
NSK	日本精工株式会社	Nippon Seikō Kabushiki-gaisha	TYO: 6471
NS Solutions	新日鉄住金ソリューションズ株式会社	Shin Nittetsu Sumikin Soryūshonzu Kabushiki-gaisha	TYO: 2327
NTN Corporation	NTN株式会社	NTN Kabushiki-gaisha	TYO: 6472
NTT	日本電信電話株式会社	Nippon Denshin Denwa Kabushiki-kaisha	TYO: 9432
NTT DoCoMo	株式会社エヌ・ティ・ティ・ドコモ	Kabushiki-gaisha Enutiti Dokomo	TYO: 9437

== O ==
English	Japanese	Rōmaji	TSE
Obayashi Corporation	株式会社大林組	Kabushiki-gaisha Ōbayashi Gumi	TYO: 1802
Odakyu Electric Railway	小田急電鉄株式会社	Odakyū Dentetsu Kabushiki-gaisha	TYO: 9007
Ohara Corporation	株式会社オハラ	Kabushiki-gaisha Ohara	TYO: 5218
Ohto	オート株式会社	Ōto kabushiki gaisha	
Oji Paper Company	王子製紙株式会社	Ōji Seishi Kabushiki-gaisha	TYO: 3861
Oki Electric Industry	沖電気工業株式会社	Oki Denki Kōgyō Kabushiki-gaisha	TYO: 6703
Okuma Corporation	オークマ株式会社	Ōkuma Kabushiki-gaisha	TYO: 6103
Okura Hotels	ホテルオークラ		
Olfa Corporation	オルファ株式会社	Orufa Kabushiki-gaisha	
Olympus	オリンパス株式会社	Orinpasu Kabushiki-gaisha	TYO: 7733
Omron	オムロン株式会社	Omuron Kabushiki-gaisha	TYO: 6645
Onkyo	オンキヨー株式会社	Onkyō Kabushiki-gaisha	TYO: 6729
Ono Pharmaceutical	小野薬品工業株式会社	Ono Yakuhin Kōgyō Kabushiki-gaisha	TYO: 4528
OPA Co., Ltd.	株式会社OPA	Kabushiki-gaisha OPA	
Orient	オリエント時計	Oriento Tokei	
The Oriental Land Company	株式会社オリエンタルランド	Kabushikigaisha Orientaru Rando	TYO: 4661
Orion Breweries	オリオンビール株式会社	Orion Bīru Kabushiki-gaisha	
Orix	オリックス株式会社	Orikkusu Kabushiki-gaisha	TYO: 8591
O.S. Engines	小川精機株式会社	Ogawa Shigeo Kabushiki-gaisha	
Osaka Gas	大阪瓦斯株式会社	Ōsaka Gasu Kabushiki-gaisha	TYO: 9532
Osaka Titanium Technologies	株式会社大阪チタニウムテクノロジーズ	Ōsaka Chitaniumu Tekunorojīzu Kabushiki-gaisha	TYO: 5726
Otsuka Pharmaceutical Co.	大塚製薬株式会社	Ōtsuka Seiyaku Kabushiki-gaisha	TYO: 4578

== P ==
English	Japanese	Rōmaji	TSE
Panasonic	パナソニック株式会社	Panasonikku Kabushiki-gaisha	TYO: 6752
Peach Aviation	Peach Aviation株式会社 (ピーチ・アビエーション 株式会社)	Pīchi Abiēshon Kabushiki Gaisha	
Penta-Ocean	五洋建設株式会社	Goyō Kensetsu Kabushiki-gaisha	TYO: 1893
Pentax	ペンタックス株式会社	Pentakkusu Kabushiki-gaisha	TYO: 7750
Pentel	ぺんてる株式会社	Penteru Kabushiki-gaisha	
Phiten	ファイテン株式会社	Faiten Kabushiki-kaisha	
Pilot Pen Corporation	株式会社パイロットコーポレーション	Kabushiki-gaisha Pairotto Kōporēshon	TYO: 7846
Pierrot	株式会社ぴえろ	Kabushiki-gaisha Piero	
Pioneer Corporation	パイオニア株式会社	Paio'nia Kabushiki-gaisha	TYO: 6773
The Pokémon Company	ja:株式会社ポケモン	Kabushiki gaisha Pokémon	
Pokka Sapporo Food & Beverage (formerly Pokka Corporation)	ポッカサッポロフード&ビバレッジ株式会社	Pokka Sapporo Fūdo & Bibarejji Kabushiki-gaisha	
Pony Canyon	株式会社ポニーキャニオン	Kabushiki-gaisha Ponī Kyanion	
Poplar	株式会社ポプラ	Kabushiki-gaisha Popura	
Prince Hotels	株式会社プリンスホテル	Kabushiki-gaisha Purinsu Hoteru	
Princeton	株式会社プリンストン	Kabushiki-gaisha Purinsuton	
Production I.G	株式会社プロダクション・アイジー	Kabushiki-gaisha Purodakusyon Ai Jī	

== R ==
English	Japanese	Rōmaji	TSE
Raizing	株式会社ライジング		
Rakuten	楽天株式会社	Rakuten Kabushiki-gaisha	TYO: 4755
Ralliart	株式会社ラリーアート	Kabushiki-gaisha Rarīāto	
RAYS	株式会社レイズ	Kabushiki-gaisha Reizu	
RE Amemiya	有限会社RE雨宮自動車	Yūgen Kaisha Āru-ī Amemiya Jidōsha	
Renesas Electronics Corporation	ルネサス エレクトロニクス株式会社	Runesasu Erekutoronikusu Kabushiki Gaisha	TYO: 6723
Renown	株式会社レナウン	Kabushiki-gaisha Renaun	TYO: 3606
Resona Holdings	株式会社りそなホールディングス	Kabushiki-gaisha Risona Hōrudingusu	TYO: 8308
Ricoh	株式会社リコー	Kabushiki-gaisha Rikō	TYO: 7752
Rinnai	リンナイ株式会社	Rin'nai Kabushiki-gaisha	TYO: 5947
Riso Kagaku Corporation	理想科学工業株式会社	Risō Kagaku Kōgyō Kabushiki-gaisha	TYO: 6413
Rohm	ローム	Rōmu	TYO: 6963
Rohto Pharmaceutical Co.	ロート製薬株式会社	Rōto Seiyaku Kabushiki-gaisha	TYO: 4527
Roland Corporation	ローランド株式会社	Rōrando Kabushiki Kaisha	TYO: 7944
Rosso Corporation	株式会社ロッソ	Kabushiki-gaisha Rosso	
Round One Corporation	株式会社ラウンドワン	Raundo Wan	TYO: 4680
Royce' Confect Company	株式会社ロイズコンフェクト	Kabushiki-gaisha Roizu Konfekuto	
Rubycon Corporation	ルビコン株式会社	Rubikon Kabushiki-gaisha	
Ryobi	リョービ株式会社	Ryobi Kabushiki-kaisha	TYO: 5851

== S ==
English	Japanese	Rōmaji	TSE
S&B Foods	エスビー食品	Esubī shokuhin kabushiki-gaisha	
Saitama Resona Bank	埼玉りそな銀行	Saitama Risona Ginkō	
Sammy Corporation	サミー株式会社	Samī kabushiki-gaisha	
San-Ai Oil	三愛石油株式会社	San-ai Sekiyu Kabushiki Kaisha	TYO: 8097
Sanden	サンデン株式会社	Sanden Kabushiki-gaisha	TYO: 6444
Sankyo Flute Company			
Santen Pharmaceutical	参天製薬株式会社	Santen Seiyaku Kabushiki-gaisha	TYO: 4536
Sanrio	株式会社サンリオ	Kabushiki-gaisha Sanrio	TYO: 8136
Sansui Electric	山水電気株式会社	Sansui Denki Kabushiki-gaisha	TYO: 6793
Sanyo	三洋電機株式会社	San'yō Denki Kabushiki-gaisha	TYO: 6764
Sapporo Brewery	サッポロビール株式会社	Sapporo Bīru Kabushiki-gaisha	
Sanwa Electronic Instrument Co., Ltd.	三和電子機器株式会社	Sanwa Denshi Kiki Kabushiki-gaisha	
SARD	株式会社サード	Kabushiki-gaisha Saado	
Sato Pharmaceutical	佐藤製薬株式会社	Satō Seiyaku Kabushiki-gaisha	
SBI Shinsei Bank	株式会社新生銀行	Kabushiki-gaisha Shinsei Ginkō	TYO: 8303
SCSK	SCSK株式会社	Esu-Shī-Esu-Kei Kabushiki-gaisha	TYO: 9719
Secom	セコム株式会社	Sekomu Kabushiki-gaisha	TYO: 9735
Sega	株式会社セガ	Kabushiki-gaisha Sega	
Sega Sammy Holdings	セガサミーホールディングス株式会社	Sega Samī Hōrudingusu Kabushiki-gaisha	TYO: 6460
Seibu Holdings	株式会社西武ホールディングス	Kabushiki-gaisha Seibu Hōrudingusu	
Seibu Railway	西武鉄道株式会社	Seibu Tetsudō Kabushiki-gaisha	
Seiko	セイコー株式会社	Seikō Kabushiki-gaisha	TYO: 8050
Seiko Epson	セイコーエプソン株式会社	Seikō Epuson Kabushiki-gaisha	TYO: 6724
Seikosha	精工舎	Seikōsha	
Seiyu Group	西友グループ	Seiyū Gurūpu	TYO: 8268
Sekisui House	積水ハウス	Sekisui Hausu	TYO: 1928
Seven & i Holdings	株式会社セブン&アイ・ホールディングス	Kabushiki-gaisha Sebun & Ai Hōrudingusu	TYO: 3382
Sharp Corporation	シャープ株式会社	Shāpu Kabushiki-gaisha	TYO: 6753
Shikoku Electric Power	四国電力株式会社	Shikoku Denryoku Kabushiki-gaisha	TYO: 9507
Shikoku Railway Company	四国旅客鉄道株式会社	Shikoku Ryokaku Tetsudō Kabushiki-gaisha	
Shimano	株式会社シマノ	Kabushiki-gaisha Shimano	TYO: 7309
Shimadzu Corporation	株式会社島津製作所	Kabushiki-gaisha Shimadzu Seisakusho	TYO: 7701
Shimizu Corporation	清水建設株式会社	Shimizu Kensetsu Kabushiki-gaisha	TYO: 1803
Shin-Etsu Chemical	信越化学工業	Shin'etsu Kagaku Kōgyō	TYO: 4063
Shinano Kenshi Co., Ltd. Well known for Plextor.	シナノケンシ株式会社	Shinano Kenshi Kabushiki-gaisha	
Shindengen Electric Manufacturing	新電元工業株式会社	Shindengen Kōgyō Kabushiki-gaisha	TYO: 6844
Shiseido (cosmetics)	株式会社資生堂	Kabushiki-gaisha Shiseidō	TYO: 4911
Shizuoka Bank	静岡銀行	Shizuoka Ginkō	TYO: 8355
Shoei	株式会社ショウエイ	Kabushiki-gaisha Shōei	TYO: 7839
Shonai Bank	株式会社 荘内銀行	Kabushikigaisha Shōnai Ginkō	TYO: 8347
SHOWA Corporation	株式会社ショーワ	Kabushiki-gaisha Shōwa	TYO: 7274
Showa Denko	昭和電工株式会社	Shōwa Denkō Kabushiki-gaisha	TYO: 4004
Showa Shell Sekiyu	昭和シェル石油株式会社	Shōwa Sheru Sekiyu Kabushiki-gaisha	TYO: 5002
Shueisha (manga publisher)	集英社	Shūeisha	
Sigma Corporation	株式会社シグマ	Kabushiki-gaisha Shiguma	
SKY Perfect	株式会社スカイパーフェクト・コミュニケーションズ	Kabushiki Gaisha Sukai Pāfekuto Komyunikēshonzu	TYO: 4795
SMC Corporation	SMC株式会社	Esu-emu-shī Kabushiki-gaisha	TYO: 6273
Smile Please	有限会社SMILEPLEASE	Yūgen gaisha SMILE PLEASE	
SNK Playmore	SNKプレイモア	Esu-enu-kei Pureimoa	
Snow Brand Milk	雪印乳業	Yukijirushi Nyūgyō	TYO: 2262
Softbank	ソフトバンク株式会社	Sofutobanku Kabushiki-gaisha	TYO: 9984
Sogo	株式会社そごう	Kabushiki-gaisha Sogō	
Sojitz	双日株式会社	Sōjitsu Kabushiki-gaisha	TYO: 2768
Sompo Japan Insurance	株式会社損害保険ジャパン	Kabushiki-gaisha Songai Hoken Japan	TYO: 8755
Sony	ソニー株式会社	Sonī Kabushiki-gaisha	TYO: 6758
Sony Global Solutions	ソニーグローバルソリューションズ株式会社	Sonī Gurōbaru Soryūshonzu Kabushiki-gaisha	
Sony Music Entertainment Japan	株式会社ソニー・ミュージックエンタテインメント	Kabushiki-gaisha Sonī Myūjikku Entateinmento	
Spike Chunsoft	株式会社スパイク・チュンソフト	Kabushiki-gaisha Supaiku Chunsofuto	
Square Enix	株式会社スクウェア・エニックス	Kabushiki-gaisha Sukuwea Enikkusu	TYO: 9684
Stanley Electric	スタンレー電気株式会社	Sutanrē Denki Kabushiki-gaisha	TYO: 6923
Star Micronics	スター精密株式会社	Sutā Seimitsu Kabushiki-gaisha	TYO: 7718
Studio Ghibli	株式会社スタジオジブリ	Kabushiki-kaisha Sutajio Jiburi	
Subaru	スバル	Subaru	
Subaru Tecnica International	スバルテクニカインターナショナル株式会社	Subaru Tekunika Intānashonaru Kabushiki-gaisha	
Sugino	株式会社スギノエンジニアリング	Kabushiki-gaisha Sugino Enjiniaringu	
Sumco	株式会社SUMCO	Kabushiki Kaisha Samuko	TYO: 3436
Sumitomo	住友グループ	Sumitomo Gurūpu	
Sumitomo Chemical	住友化学株式会社	Sumitomo Kagaku Kabushiki-gaisha	TYO: 4005
Sumitomo Electric	住友電気工業	Sumitomo Denki Kōgyō	TYO: 5802
Sumitomo Heavy Industries	住友重機械工業	Sumitomo Jū-kikai Kōgyō	TYO: 6302
Sumitomo Metal Industries	住友金属工業株式会社	Sumitomo Kinzoku Kōgyō Kabushiki-gaisha	TYO: 5405
Sumitomo Metal Mining	住友金属鉱山株式会社	Sumitomo Kinzoku Kōzan Kabushiki-gaisha	TYO: 5713
Sumitomo Mitsui Financial Group	株式会社三井住友フィナンシャルグループ	Kabushiki-gaisha Mitsui Sumitomo Finansharu Gurūpu	TYO: 8316
Sumitomo Mitsui Banking Corporation	三井住友銀行	Mitsui Sumitomo Ginkō	
Sumitomo Mitsui Construction	三井住友建設株式会社	Sumitomo Mitsui Kensetsu Kabushiki-gaisha	TYO: 1821
Sumitomo Realty & Development	住友不動産	Sumitomo Fudōsan	TYO: 8830
Sumitomo Riko		Sumitomo Rikō Kabushiki-gaisha	TYO: 5191
Sumitomo Rubber Industries	住友ゴム工業株式会社	Sumitomo Gomu Kōgyo Kabushiki-gaisha	TYO: 5110
Sumitomo Trust & Banking	住友信託銀行	Sumitomo Shintaku Ginkō	TYO: 8403
Sunrise	株式会社サンライズ	Kabushiki-gaisha Sanraizu	
Suntory	サントリー株式会社	Santorī Kabushiki-gaisha	
SR SunTour (Maeda Industries)	サンツアー	San Tsuā	
Suzuki	スズキ株式会社	Suzuki Kabushikigaisha	TYO: 7269
Sysmex	シスメックス	Shisumekkusu Kabushiki-gaisha	TYO: 6869

== T ==
English	Japanese	Rōmaji	Ticker symbol
T&D Holdings	T&Dホールディングス	Ti-ando-Di Hōrudingusu	TYO: 8795
T. Hasegawa	長谷川香料株式会社	Hasegawa Kōryō Kabushiki-gaisha	TYO: 4958
Tadano	株式会社タダノ	Kabushiki-gaisha Tadano	TYO: 6395
Taiheiyo Cement	太平洋セメント株式会社	Taiheiyō Semento Kabushiki-gaisha	TYO: 5233
Taisei Corporation	大成建設株式会社	Taisei Kensetsu Kabushiki-gaisha	TYO: 1801
Taisho Pharmaceutical	大正製薬株式会社	Taishō Seiyaku Kabushiki-gaisha	TYO: 4581
Taito	タイトー株式会社	Taitō Kabushiki-gaisha	
Taiyo Kogyo Corporation	太陽工業株式会社	Taiyō Kōgyō Kabushiki-gaisha	
Taiyo Nippon Sanso Corporation	大陽日酸株式会社	Taiyō Nissan Kabushiki-gaisha	TYO: 4091
Taiyo Yuden	太陽誘電	Taiyō Yūden	TYO: 6976
Takamine	高峰楽器製作所	Kabushiki-gaisha Takamine Gakki Seisakusho	
Takara Holdings	宝ホールディングス株式会社	Takara Hōrudingusu Kabushiki-gaisha	TYO: 2531
Takasago International Corporation	高砂香料工業株式会社	Takasago Kōryō Kōgyō Kabushiki-gaisha	TYO: 4914
Takashimaya	株式会社高島屋	Kabushiki-gaisha Takashimaya	TYO: 8233
Takeda Pharmaceutical	武田薬品工業株式会社	Takeda Yakuhin Kōgyō Kabushiki-gaisha	TYO: 4502
Takefuji	株式会社武富士	Kabushiki-gaisha Takefuji	TYO: 8564
Takenaka Corporation	株式会社竹中工務店	Kabushiki-gaisha Takenaka Kōmuten	
Takeuchi Manufacturing	株式会社竹内製作所	Kabushiki-gaisha Takeuchi Seisakujo	TYO: 6432
Tama Drums	多満タマ	Tama	
Tamasu known for its Butterfly brand	株式会社タマス	Kabushiki-gaisha Tamasu	
Tamiya Corporation	株式会社タミヤ	Kabushiki-gaisha Tamiya	
Tamron	株式会社タムロン,	Kabushiki-gaisha Tamuron	TYO: 7740
Tanaka Kikinzoku	田中貴金属工業株式会社	Tanaka Kikinzoku Kōgyō Kabushiki-gaisha	
TDK Corporation	TDK株式会社	TDK Kabushiki-gaisha	TYO: 6762
TEAC Corporation	ティアック株式会社	Tiakku Kabushiki-gaisha	TYO: 6803
Teijin	帝人株式会社	Teijin Kabushiki-gaisha	TYO: 3401
Tenyo	ja:テンヨー	Tenyo	
Terumo	テルモ株式会社	Terumo Kabushiki-gaisha	TYO: 4543
THK	THK株式会社	THK Kabushiki-gaisha	TYO: 6481
Tiger Corporation	タイガー魔法瓶株式会社	Taigā Mahōbin Kabushiki-gaisha	
TOA Corporation	TOA株式会社	Tī Ō Ē Kabushiki-gaisha	TYO: 6809
Toagosei	東亞合成株式会社	Toagosei Kabushiki-gaisha	TYO: 4045
Toaplan	東亜プラン	Tōa Puran	
Tobu Railway	東武鉄道株式会社	Tōbu Tetsudō Kabushiki-gaisha	TYO: 9001
Toda Racing	株式会社戸田レーシング	Kabushiki-gaisha Toda Reeshingu	
Toei Animation	東映アニメーション株式会社	Tōei Animēshon Kabushiki-gaisha	JASDAQ: 4816
Toei Company	東映株式会社	Tōei Kabushiki-gaisha	TYO: 9605
Tohatsu	トーハツ株式会社	Tōhatsu Kabushiki-gaisha	
Toho	東宝株式会社	Tōhō Kabushiki-gaisha	TYO: 9602
Toho Bank	東邦銀行	Tōhō Ginkō	TYO: 8346
Toho Zinc	東邦亜鉛株式会社	Tōhō Aen Kabushiki-gaisha	TYO: 5707
Tohoku Bank	東北銀行	Tōhoku Ginkō	TYO: 8349
Tohoku Electric Power	東北電力株式会社	Tōhoku Denryoku Kabushiki-gaisha	TYO: 9506
Tokai Carbon	東海カーボン株式会社	Tōkai Kābon Kabushiki-gaisha	TYO: 5301
Tokaido	東海堂	Tōkaidō	
Tokio Marine	東京海上ホールディングス株式会社	Tōkyō Kaijō Hōrudingusu Kabushiki-gaisha	
Tokio Marine & Nichido Fire Insurance	東京海上日動火災保険株式会社	Tōkyō Kaijō Nichidō Kasai Hoken Kabushiki-gaisha	
Tokuyama Corporation	株式会社トクヤマ	Kabushiki-gaisha Tokuyama	TYO: 4043
Tokyo Broadcasting System	株式会社東京放送	Kabushiki-gaisha Tōkyō Hōsō	TYO: 9401
Tokyo Electric Power	東京電力株式会社	Tōkyō Denryoku Kabushiki-gaisha	TYO: 9501
Tokyo Electron	東京エレクトロン株式会社	Tōkyō Erekutoron Kabushiki-gaisha	TYO: 8035
Tokyo FM	株式会社エフエム東京	Kabushiki-gaisha Efu Emu Tōkyō	
Tokyo Gas	東京瓦斯株式会社	Tōkyō Gasu Kabushiki-gaisha	TYO: 9531
Tokyo Tatemono	東京建物株式会社	Tōkyō Tatemōnō Kabushiki-gaisha	TYO: 8804
Tokyo Marui	株式会社東京マルイ	Kabushiki-gaisha Tōkyō Marui	
Tokyo Metro	東京メトロ	Tōkyō Metoro	
Tokyo MX	東京メトロポリタンテレビジョン株式会社	Tōkyō Metoroporitan Terebijon Kabushiki Kaisha	
Tokyu Corporation	東京急行電鉄株式会社	Tōkyō Kyūkō Dentetsu Kabushiki-gaisha	TYO: 9005
Tokyu Land	東急不動産	Tōkyū Fudōsan	TYO: 8815
Tombow	株式会社トンボ鉛筆	Kabushiki-gaisha Tonbo Enpitsu	
TOM'S	株式会社トムス	Kabushiki-gaisha Tomusu	
Tomita Dream Sales	株式会社トミタ夢販売	Kabushiki Kaisha Tomita Yume Hanbai	
Tomy	株式会社タカラトミー	Kabushiki-gaishi Takara Tomī	TYO: 7867
Top Secret	株式会社トップシークレット	Kabushiki-gaisha Toppu Shīkuretto	
Topcon	株式会社トプコン	Kabushiki-gaisha Topukon	TYO: 7732
Toppan Printing	凸版印刷	Toppan Insatsu	TYO: 7911
Topy Industries	トピー工業株式会社	Topī Kōgyō Kabushiki-gaisha	TYO: 7231
Toray	東レ株式会社	Tōre Kabushiki-gaisha	TYO: 3402
Toraya Confectionery	株式会社虎屋	Kabushiki-gaisha Toraya	
Toshiba	株式会社東芝	Kabushiki-gaisha Tōshiba	TYO: 6502
Tosoh	東ソー株式会社	Tōsō Kabushiki-gaisha	TYO: 4042
Toto	TOTO株式会社	Tōtō Kabushiki-gaisha	TYO: 5332
Toy's Factory	株式会社トイズファクトリー	Kabushiki gaisha Toizu Fakutori	
Toyo Engineering Corporation	東洋エンジニアリング株式会社	Tōyō Enjiniaringu Kabushiki-gaisha	TYO: 6330
Toyo Rikagaku Kenkyusho	東陽理化学研究所		
Toyo Seikan	東洋製罐グループホールディングス株式会社	Tōyō Seikan Gurūpu Hōrudingusu Kabushiki-gaisha	TYO: 5901
Toyo Suisan Kaisha	東洋水産株式会社	Tōyō Suisan Kabushiki-gaisha	TYO: 2875
Toyo Tire & Rubber Company	東洋ゴム工業株式会社	Tōyō Gomu Kōgyo Kabushiki-gaisha	TYO: 5105
Toyobo	東洋紡株式会社	Tōyōbōseki Kabushiki-gaisha	TYO: 3101
Toyota	トヨタ自動車株式会社	Toyota Jidōsha Kabushiki-gaisha	TYO: 7203
Toyota Boshoku	トヨタ紡織株式会社	Toyota Bōshoku Kabushiki-gaisha	TYO: 3116
Toyota Industries	豊田自動織機	Toyota Jidō Shokki	TYO: 6201
Toyota Tsusho	豊田通商株式会社	Toyota Tsūshō Kabushiki-gaisha	TYO: 8015
Treasure	株式会社トレジャー	Kabushiki-gaisha Torejā	
Trend Micro	トレンドマイクロ株式会社	Torendo Maikuro Kabushiki-gaisha	TYO: 4704
Trust Company Ltd. known for its GReddy brand	株式会社トラスト	Kabushiki-gaisha Torasuto	
Tsubakimoto Chain	株式会社椿本チエイン	Kabushiki-gaisha Tsubakimoto Chiein	TYO: 6371
TV Asahi	株式会社 テレビ朝日	Kabushiki-gaisha Terebi Asahi	TYO: 9409
TV Tokyo	株式会社テレビ東京	Kabushiki Gaisha Terebi Tōkyō	TYO: 9411

== U ==
English	Japanese	Rōmaji	TSE
UBE Industries	宇部興産株式会社	Ube Kōsan Kabushiki-gaisha	TYO: 4208
UCC Ueshima Coffee	UCC上島珈琲株式会社	Yū Shī Shī Ueshima Kōhī Kabushiki-gaisha	
Ufotable	ユーフォーテーブル有限会社	Yūfōtēburu yūgen-gaisha	
Umios	ウミオス株式会社	Umios Kabushiki-gaisha	TYO: 1333
Uniadex	ユニアデックス株式会社	Yuniadekkusu Kabushiki-gaisha	
Uniden	ユニデン株式会社	Yuniden Kabushiki-gaisha	TYO: 6815
Unitika	ユニチカ株式会社	Yunichika Kabushiki-gaisha	TYO: 3103
Uniqlo	株式会社ユニクロ	Kabushiki-gaisha Yunikuro	
Unicharm	株式会社ユニチャーム	Kabushiki-gaisha Yunichaamu	TYO: 8113
UNY	ユニー株式会社	Yunī Kabushiki-gaisha	TYO: 8270
Ushio, Inc.	ウシオ電機株式会社	Ushio Denki Kabushiki-gaisha	TYO: 6925

== V ==
English	Japanese	Rōmaji	TSE
VAP	株式会社バップ	Kabushiki gaisha Bappu	
Veilside	ヴェイルサイド	Vueirusaido kabushiki gaisha	

== W ==
English	Japanese	Rōmaji	TSE
Wacom	ワコム	Kabushiki-gaisha Wakomu	TYO: 3591
West Japan Railway	西日本旅客鉄道株式会社	Nishi-Nihon Ryokaku Tetsudō Kabushiki-gaisha	TYO: 9021
Work Wheels	株式会社ワーク	Kabushiki-gaisha Wāku	

== Y ==
English	Japanese	Rōmaji	TSE
Yaesu	八重洲無線株式会社	Yaesu Musen Kabushiki-gaisha	
Yamabiko Corporation	株式会社やまびこ	Kabushiki-gaisha Yamabiko	TYO: 6250
Yakult Honsha	株式会社ヤクルト本社	Kabushiki-gaisha Yakuruto Honsha	
Yamada Denki	株式会社ヤマダ電機	Kabushiki-gaisha Yamada Denki	TYO: 9831
Yamagata Bank	株式会社山形銀行	Kabushiki-gaisha Yamagata Ginkō	TYO: 8344
Yamaguchi Bank	山口銀行	Yamaguchi Ginkō	
Yamaha	ヤマハ株式会社	Yamaha Kabushiki Gaisha	TYO: 7951
Yamaha Motors	ヤマハ発動機株式会社	Yamaha Hatsudōki Kabushiki-gaisha	TYO: 7272
Yamasa	ヤマサ醤油株式会社	Yamasa Shoyu Kabushiki-gaisha	TYO: 8360
Yamamoto Kogaku	山本光学株式会社	Yamamoto Kōgaku Kabushiki-gaisha	
Yamato Transport	ヤマト運輸株式会社	Yamato Un'yu Kabushiki-gaisha	TYO: 9064
Yamazaki Baking	山崎製パン	Yamazaki-sei Pan	TYO: 2212
Yamazaki Mazak Corporation	ヤマザキマザック株式会社	Yamazaki Mazakku Kabushiki-gaisha	
Yanagisawa Wind Instruments			
Yanmar	ヤンマー株式会社	Yanmā Kabushiki-gaisha	
Yaskawa Electric	株式会社安川電機	Kabushiki-gaisha Yasukawa Denki	TYO: 6506
Yazaki	矢崎総業株式会社	Yazaki Sōgyō Kabushiki-gaisha	
YKK	YKK株式会社	Waikeikei Kabushiki-gaisha	
Yokogawa Electric	横河電機	Yokogawa Denki	TYO: 6841
Yokohama Rubber Company	横浜ゴム株式会社	Yokohama Gomu Kabushiki-gaisha	TYO: 5101
Yokohama Shinkin Bank	ja:横浜信用金庫 - ヨコハマ シンヨウ キンコ		
Yokomo	株式会社ヨコモ	Kabushiki-gaisha Yokomo	
Yoshimoto Kogyo	吉本興業株式会社	Yoshimoto Kōgyō Kabushiki-	TYO: 9665
Yoshinoya	吉野家	Yoshinoya	TYO: 9861
Yuyama	株式会社 湯山製作所	Kabushiki-gaisha Yuyama	

== Z ==
English	Japanese	Rōmaji	TSE
Zebra	ゼブラ株式会社	Zebura Kabushiki gaisha	
Zenrin	株式会社ゼンリン	Kabushiki-gaisha Zenrin	TYO: 9474
Zojirushi	象印マホービン株式会社	Zōjirushi Mahōbin Kabushiki-gaisha	TYO: 7965
Zuken	株式会社図研	Kabushiki-gaisha Zuken	TYO: 6947

== Former companies, including acquired and merged ones ==
- Bandai and Namco - Merged to form Bandai Namco Entertainment
- Data East - went into Bankruptcy
- Dream Stage Entertainment
- Daiei Film - went into Bankruptcy, later became part of Tokuma Shoten and now part of Kadokawa Pictures
- Japanese National Railways 日本国有鉄道 - Reorganized into Japan Railways Group
- Japan Post 日本郵政公社 - Reorganized into Japan Post Group
- Koei and Tecmo - Merged to form Koei Tecmo
- Konica and Minolta - Merged to form Konica Minolta
- Prince Motor merged into Nissan
- Spike and Chunsoft - Merged to form Spike Chunsoft
- Square and Enix - Merged to form Square Enix
- Daiichi Pharmaceutical Co. and Sankyo Co. - Merged to form Daiichi Sankyo
- Takata Corporation - went bankrupt then was acquired by Joyson Safety Systems
- Yamanouchi Pharmaceutical and Fujisawa Pharmaceutical - Merged to form Astellas Pharma
- Yaohan
- Tomen - Acquired by Toyota Tsusho
- Nichimen and Nissho Iwai - Merged to form Sojitz

== See also ==
- List of companies of Asia
- Keiretsu
- Zaibatsu
- List of railway companies in Japan
