= Masataka Shimizu =

Japanese company executive

- Born: June 23, 1944 (age 82); Kanagawa Prefecture, Japan
- Education: Keio University
- Occupation: Businessman
- Known for: President and CEO of Tokyo Electric Power Company (TEPCO)

Masataka Shimizu (清水 政孝, Shimizu Masataka; born June 23, 1944) is a director of Fuji Oil Company, and was the president and chief executive officer of Japanese electric utility Tokyo Electric Power Company (Tepco) from 2008 to 2011. He was also a vice-chairman of Keidanren, the employers' federation of the companies of Japan, until he stepped down after the Fukushima Daiichi nuclear disaster. On July 25, 2012, he became an outside director of Fuji Oil.

== Biography ==
Shimizu was born on June 23, 1944, in Kanagawa Prefecture, and graduated from Keio University in 1968. He was placed in charge of general affairs for Fukushima Daini Nuclear Power Plant in 1983. He was appointed president of Tepco in June 2008.

== President of Tepco ==
Before his presidency, an earthquake in Niigata in 2007 caused fire and radioactivity releases at the Kashiwazaki-Kariwa nuclear plant, forcing the plant to shut down. As a cost cutter, he was praised for improving profitability of the company.

On January 18, 2011, Shimizu attended the annual meeting of World Economic Forum, stating said that his company sought to provide a “stable supply of electricity and environmental protection”.

== Exposure of misconduct as a president of TEPCO ==
Based on the experience of the 2004 Indian Ocean earthquake and tsunami, MISA (Japan's Nuclear and Industrial Safety Agency) of the Ministry of Economy, METI(Trade and Industry) officially issued a heads-up in 2006, insisting that there was a high risk of electric power loss if an unexpected tsunami hit the nuclear power plant. Nevertheless, the upper management, led by TEPCO President Masataka Shimizu, ignored this warning.

Therefore, Tsunehisa Katsumata, a current chair man of TEPCO, admitted that the Fukushima Daiichi nuclear disaster was also a kind of man-made disaster caused by the incompetence of Masataka Shimizu.

In July 2022, a court in Tokyo found Masataka Shimizu and four other TEPCO executives liable for ¥13 trillion of damages in a lawsuit filed by 48 TEPCO shareholders. It is not expected that the executives will have the ability to pay this full amount, but will pay as much as their assets allow. A sixth executive was found to not be liable.

== After the Fukushima Daiichi nuclear disaster ==
Following the March 2011 Fukushima Daiichi nuclear disaster, Shimizu remained inside the general headquarters for two weeks beginning on March 13, 2011, two days after the 2011 Tōhoku earthquake and tsunami. Because of his disappearance, it was rumored that Shimizu had fled or committed suicide. An April 7, Shimizu resumed work after a sick leave due to overwork. On May 20, Shimizu resigned and was replaced by Toshio Nishizawa, general ex-director of the group Tepco.

On March 7, 2012, before the anniversary of the disaster, Tepco announced that Chairman Katsumata Tsunehisa would attend the memorial ceremony. However, they refused to release the schedule of Shimizu. On June 25, 2012, Shimizu became an outside director of Fuji Oil Company, a subsidiary of AOC Holdings. On October 1, 2013, AOC Holdings absorbed Fuji Oil and subsequently renamed Fuji Oil Company, Ltd. Since then Shimizu has been a director of the new Fuji Oil Company. Tepco is the largest shareholder of Fuji Oil Company (TYO: 5017), owning 8.74% of the stock.
