= Equipe =

Equipe or Équipe may refer to:

- Bond Equipe, a car
- L'Équipe, a French newspaper devoted to sports
- L'Équipe (TV channel)
- L'Équipe, a television series produced by Search for Common Ground

== See also ==
- L'Équipeur, a clothing retailer in Canada
- Equip (disambiguation)
