= Princeton (electronics company) =

Japanese electronics company

Princeton Ltd.
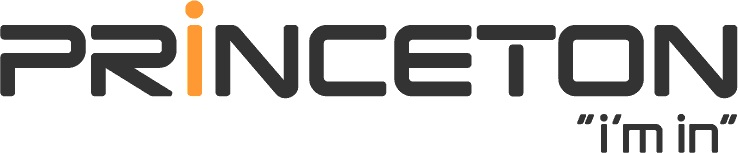
- Native name: 株式会社 プリンストン
- Romanized name: Kabushiki-gaisha Purinsuton
- Formerly: Princeton Technology Ltd. (1995-2014)
- Type: Private
- Industry: Computer hardware Electronics
- Founded: 7 March 1995
- Founder: Toshiya Nakade
- Headquarters: Shinbashi Tokyu Building, Tokyo, Japan
- Products: SD cards USB flash drives DRAM; LCD; Hard disk drives NAS
- Number of employees: 150
- Website: Official Website

Princeton Ltd. (株式会社プリンストン, Kabushiki-gaisha Purinsuton) is a Japanese company headquartered in Tokyo, Japan, that offers computer hardware and electronics products.

== Overview ==
Princeton Technology Ltd. was originally established in 1995. The company is a fabless manufacturing company, designing products which are ordered to manufactures in Taiwan and China. The company offers flash memory products (SD cards, USB flash drives), DRAM, LCD, LED display, Hard disk drives, NAS and other electronic products. Princeton products are sold mostly in Japan, but can be found online on websites such as Amazon. The business type and scope is same as Green House, Elecom and Buffalo, also based in Japan. In 2014, the company name was changed from Princeton Technology Ltd. to Princeton Ltd..

As a computer hardware supplier, Princeton has contributed to offer the various flash memory and DRAM products to major electronics companies in Japan, such as Sony, Panasonic and Toshiba.

Princeton is also the official agency of Cisco, Polycom, Edgewater networks, Proware Technology, Drobo, and more, and has introduced several cloud collaboration systems and SAN systems in Japan. The company has presented IT solutions for education systems by installing Cisco and Edgewater networks cloud collaboration products, for instance, SAN systems by installing Princeton, Proware Technology and Drobo NAS products.

== See also ==
- List of companies of Japan
