= Elecom =

Japanese electronics company

Elecom Co., Ltd. エレコム株式会社
- Type: KK
- Traded as: TYO: 6750
- Industry: Information technology Computer hardware Electronics
- Founded: 1986; 40 years ago
- Founder: Junji Hada
- Headquarters: Osaka, Japan
- Number of locations: 23
- Revenue: ¥76,554,000,000; ¥99,362,000,000 (incl. subs.); (2019)
- Total equity: ¥6,990,000,000 (2019)
- Number of employees: 792 (2019)
- Subsidiaries: see below
- Website: Official website

Elecom Co., Ltd. (エレコム株式会社, Erekomu Kabushikgaisha) is a Japanese electronics company founded by Junji Hada in Osaka, Japan in 1986. They manufacture office and other furniture for use with electronics, computer peripherals, gaming peripherals, computer memory USB flash drives, keyboards and other related devices.

== History ==
Elecom was founded in May 1986 in Osaka, Japan by Junji Hada (葉田順治, Hada Junji). The company opened a facility in Miyakojima-ku and manufactured office furniture such as computer desks. In November of the same year, they opened an office in Itabashi in Tokyo. The following November, offices were opened in Nagoya and Fukuoka. A Tokyo distribution center was opened in December 1988.

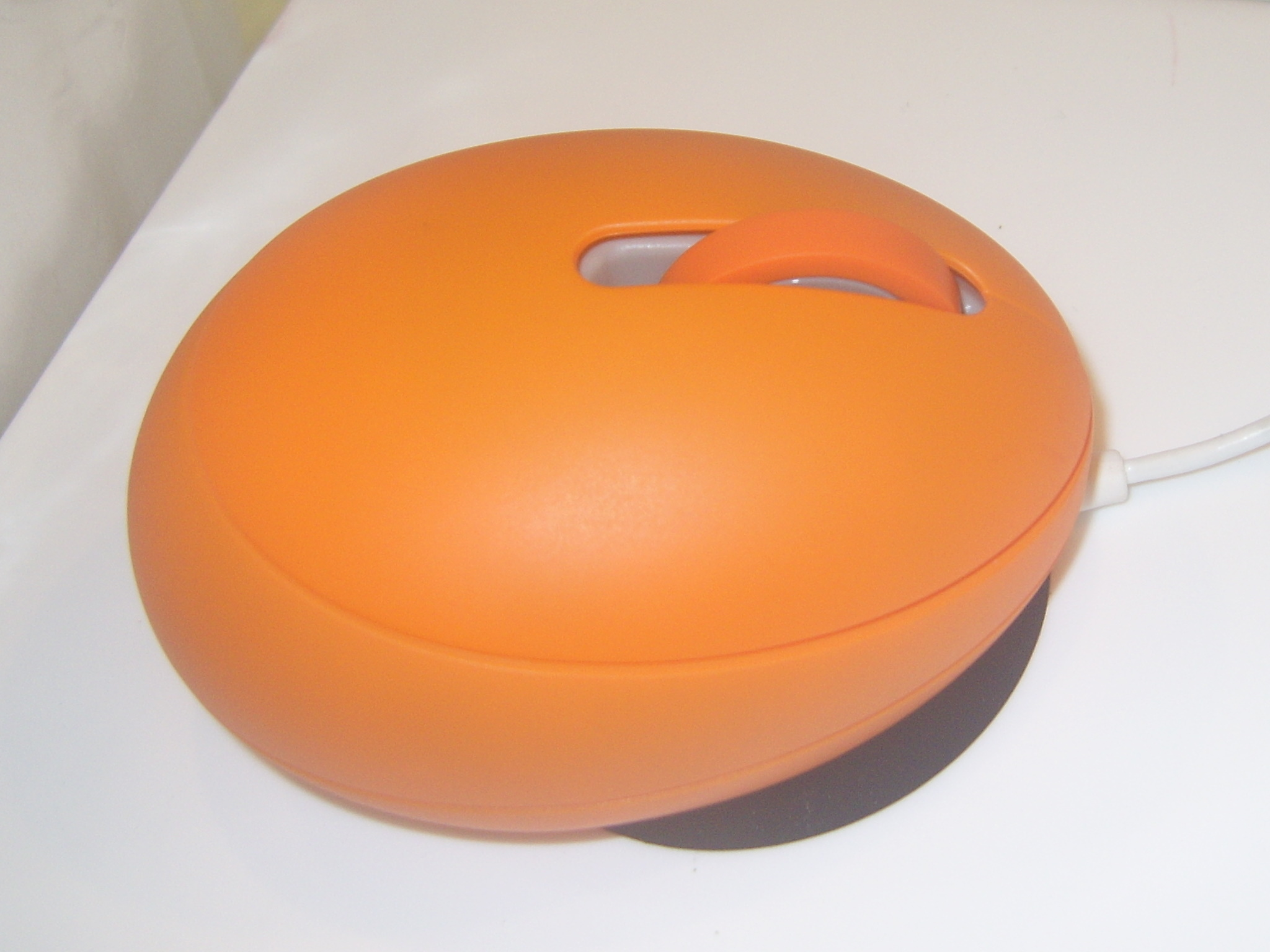
Elecom optical Egg mouse, 2008

Elecom introduced an oval mouse in 1988, which was sold in Japan and was shaped differently to the rectangular mouse that was popular at that time. The company claims that this design would be the global standard of future mice. Elecom have periodically resurrected their iconic oval mouse in later years.

Their first numeric keypad was launched in September 1989. The following September, an office was opened in Sapporo, and their Sendai office was expanded to include a distribution center in March 1991. Elecom Sales (エレコム販売株式会社, Erekomu Hanbai Kabushikigaisha) was spun-off in July 1991, with offices in Minamikawachi. Elecom Computer Products was established in the United States in September 1992.

Seiko Epson sued Elecom and manufacturer Ester Industries in September 2000, claiming that Elecom's manufacturing and sales of ink cartridges compatible with Epson printers infringed on their patent. The suit was dismissed in March 2002 when the Japan Patent Office withdrew Seiko Epson's patent, stating it did not meet the requirement for originality. (Note: The wording used by the JPO was "Invalid [due to] lack of originality" (「新規性がなく無効」, Shinkisei ga naku mukō))

An Elecom pouch

Elecom won the top spot in the categories for mobile phone audio accessory, mobile phone battery charger, smartphone case, smartphone screen protector, and tablet accessory every year from 2017 to 2020 in the annual BCN Awards (given out by the POS marketing information company BCN since 2000). Due to COVID-19, demand for webcams and microphones tripled or quadrupled due to the increase in people working from home. At the same time, due to the increase in popularity of notebook computers, the demand for its computer stands has sharply decreased, causing them to quickly change the company's product focus.

A charity golf tournament was hosted by Elecom at the Yomiuri Country Club in on June 17, 2020, to raise money for healthcare workers due to the impact of COVID-19. It was the first professional golf tournament since the spread of the virus.

In June 2020, Daiwa Securities reported they had reduced their holdings in Elecom from 5.20 percent to 3.45 percent.

== Market share ==
An Elecom shop in Japan

Elecom controls a large percent of the market share in Japan in various product categories, including #1 in computer mice, keyboards, and speakers in 2010. Its products have won the Good Design Award 106 times between 1993 and 2019.

The company produces electronics as an OEM that are shipped to many outside and larger companies. In 2020 in Japan, they controlled 57.2 percent of the tablet accessory market, 49.5 percent of the mobile phone audio accessory market, 31.2 percent of the smartphone case market, 38.3 percent of the smartphone screen protector market, and 33.3 percent of the mobile phone battery charger market.

== Corporate subsidiaries ==
The company and its subsidiaries have offices worldwide, including in South Korea, the Philippines, the United States, The Netherlands, Germany, and China. Elecom has subsidiaries in Japan and around the world:

- D-Clue Technologies
- DX Antenna (founded in August 1953, bought from Funai in 2017)
  - DX Antenna Marketing
  - DX Antenna Philippines
- Elecom Shanghai (新宜丽客(上海)商贸有限公司)
- Elecom Hong Kong
  - Elecom Sales Hong Kong
- Elecom Korea
- Elecom Singapore
- Elecom Support & Service
- Elecom Healthcare
- Hagiwara Solutions (founded in November 1971 as "Hagiwara Sys-Com", went bankrupt in 2011, absorbed as a subsidiary into Elecom)
- Logitec (founded in June 1982, purchased by Elecom in December 2004 via stock buyout)
  - Logitec INA Solutions

== See also ==
- List of companies of Japan
