= Canon IT Solutions =

Japanese IT company

Canon IT Solutions Inc.
- Native name: キヤノンIT ソリューションズ 株式会社
- Type: Private K.K.
- Industry: System integration Information security Computer software
- Founded: 1982
- Headquarters: Tokyo, Japan
- Revenue: JPY 75.6 billion
- Total assets: JPY 3.61 billion
- Number of employees: 3,107 (2017)
- Parent: Canon Marketing Japan
- Website: Official Website

Canon IT Solutions Inc. (キヤノンITソリューションズ株式会社, Kyanon Ai-Tī Soryūshonzu Kabushiki-gaisha) is a Japanese company headquartered in Tokyo, Japan, that offers IT services.

== Overview ==
Originally, in 1982, Sumitomo Metal System Developments Inc. was established by Sumitomo Metal Industries Ltd. In 2000, Sumitomo Metal System Developments Inc. and Sumitomo Metal Software Factory Inc. were merged, then the company name was changed to Sumitomo Metal System Solutions Inc. In 2002, Canon Marketing Japan Inc. acquired Sumitomo Metal System Solutions Inc. from Sumitomo Metal Industries Ltd., and then the company name was changed to Canon System Solutions Inc.

On the other hand, in 1984, Algo 21 Inc. was established by Nihon Unisys Ltd. (Unisys of Japan). In 2007, Canon Marketing Japan Inc. acquired Algo 21 Inc. from Nihon Unisys Ltd. In 2008, Canon Marketing Japan Inc. merged Canon System Solutions Inc. and Algo 21 Inc., then the company name was changed to Canon IT Solutions Inc.

Canon IT Solutions Inc. is not a subsidiary of Canon Inc., but a second-generation subsidiary of Canon Inc., because Canon Marketing Japan Inc. has 100% equity in Canon IT Solutions Inc.

The company offers the services of system integration, cloud computing, and information security, and provides computer software mainly in Japan for enterprises, apart from Canon group. Canon IT Solutions is known that the company provides some characteristic software, for example, "Edian" is a DTP software for big size advertisement printing, "RubyNavigation" is a DTP software for putting ruby characters on Chinese characters, etc.

== See also ==
- List of companies of Japan
