= Equip =

The word equip can refer to:

- to equip, to have equipment, ie. tools
- Equip (gaming) in videogames
- EQUIP, an international ministry.
- EquipFM 91.7 MHz WEQP, Rustburg, Virginia, USA; a radio station
- WORK Equip, a model of wheels manufactured by Work Co., Ltd.
- Train-and-equip program, a type of foreign military aid program

== See also ==
- Do not equip (DNE)
- Equippable Abilities
- Going equipped (crime) a British crime
- Equipage
- Équipe (disambiguation)
