= Yokohama Shinkin Bank =

Japanese credit union

Coordinates: 35°27′08″N 139°38′34″E

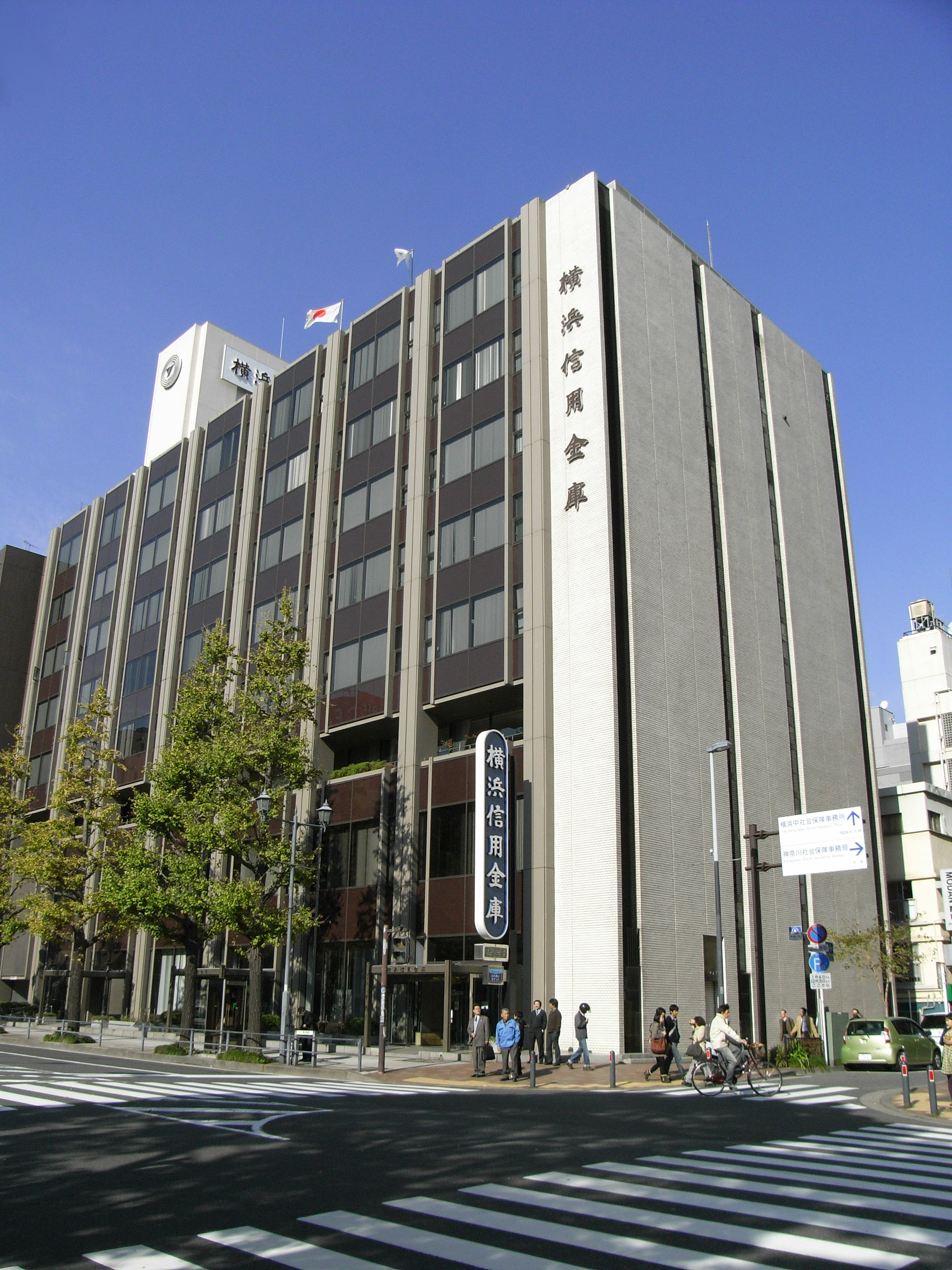
- Yokohama Shinkin Bank Head Office
- Type: Public Limited liabity company
- Industry: Banking, Financial services
- Founded: July 1, 1923; 103 years ago
- Headquarters: 2-16-1, Naka-ku Onoe-cho, 231-8466, Yokohama, Japan
- Website: http://www.yokoshin.co.jp/

The Yokohama Shinkin Bank (横浜信用金庫 - ヨコハマ シンヨウ キンコ) is a credit union whose head office is located in the Naka ward of the Kanagawa Prefecture of Yokohama. It is commonly known as Yokoshin.

== Overview ==
It is the only Shinkin bank (credit union) with a head office in Yokohama City. To the north, it competes with the credit unions: Kawasaki Shinkin Bank, Jonan Shinkin Bank, and Shiba Shinkin Bank, and in the south with Shonan Shinkin Bank and Kanagawa Shinkin Bank.

== History ==
- July 1923 (Taisho 12) – Kanagawa Prefecture Veterans Credit Union, Limited Liability, was established under the Industrial Cooperatives Act.
- April 1939 (Showa 14) - Name changed to Yokohama Shinkin Bank Limited Liability,
- November 1943 (Showa 18) - January 1950 (Showa 25) - Merged with Kanazawamachi Credit Union and four other credit unions.
- 1951 (Showa 26)）
  - April - The Yokohama, Shiota, and Tsurumi credit unions merge to form the Yokohama Credit Union under the Small and Medium Enterprise Cooperative Association Act.
  - October - Reorganized into Yokohama Shinkin Bank in accordance with the Shinkin Bank Act.
- April 1954 - Merged with Yokohama City Reconstruction Shinkin Bank.
- May 1957 - Merged with Yokohama City Commerce and Industry Shinkin Bank.
- March 1970 - The head office was moved to Onoue-cho, Naka-ku.
- October 2009 - Opened an administrative center in Kita-Shin-Yokohama, Kohoku Ward.

== Business offices ==
Business offices, where people can join the credit union and receive loans, are located at the head office, and branches in Yokohama, Kawasaki, Yamato, Ebina, Fujisawa, and Machida, Tokyo.

== See also ==
- List of companies of Japan
