= JAL Infotec =

JAL Information Technology Co., Ltd.
- Native name: 株式会社; JALインフォテック
- Type: Private K.K.
- Industry: System integration Information security Computer software
- Founded: 1978
- Headquarters: Tokyo, Japan
- Total assets: JPY 72.4 million
- Parent: Japan Airlines
- Subsidiaries: JTA Infotec
- Website: Official Website

JAL Information Technology Co., Ltd. (株式会社JALインフォテック, Kabushiki-gaisha Jaru Infotekku), commonly known as JAL Infotec also in English, is a Japanese company headquartered in Tokyo, Japan, that offers IT services.

== Overview ==
Originally, in 1978, JAL Information Technology Co., Ltd. (JAL Infotec) was established by Japan Airlines Co., Ltd. In 2001, IBM Japan started outsourcing services regarding JAL Infotec, and then in 2002, IBM Japan got the majority (51%) of JAL Infotec from Japan Airlines. In 2011, Japan Airlines bought back the majority of JAL Infotec from IBM Japan, for reducing the outsourcing costs, as one step of the restructuring of the JAL group.

The company offers the services of system integration, cloud computing, and information security, and provides computer software within the JAL group.

== See also ==
- List of companies of Japan
