= Media Create =

Japanese video game sales analysis and publishing

Media Create (株式会社メディアクリエイト, Kabushiki Gaisha Media Kurieito) is a Japanese company that gathers and analyzes data from the digital entertainment industry, specifically focusing on the Japanese console gaming market. Business operations include publishing, market research and consulting.

== Weekly sales figures ==
On Fridays (Japan Standard Time), the official Japanese website is updated with the top fifty selling video games of the previous week, as well as hardware sales figures for the Nintendo Switch, Nintendo DS, Nintendo DS Lite, Wii, PlayStation 5, PlayStation 4, PlayStation 3, PlayStation Portable, PlayStation 2, GameCube, Game Boy Advance, Game Boy Advance SP, Game Boy Micro, Xbox Series X/S, Xbox, and Xbox 360. Sales numbers are only provided for the top twenty games on the list, but figures exist for the rest of the games on the list and beyond; they must be paid for and subscribed to. The English website only posts the placement rankings of games and the percentage ranking of hardware.

== Competition ==
Media Create competes with Enterbrain's Famitsu and MediaWorks' Dengeki PlayStation in the market for providing Japanese game sales data. Because there are three different tracking firms, there will always be three different sales numbers for any software and hardware title. Which company to trust is a matter of debate, as none of the three major trackers are ever 100% accurate and whoever tracks the highest amount of sales for a given title fluctuates.

Nintendo cites Media Create sales data during its conferences and presentations.
