= Toyo Seikan =

Toyo Seikan Group Holdings, Ltd.
- Company type: Public KK
- Traded as: TYO: 5901; OSE: 5901
- ISIN: JP3613400005
- Industry: Packaging
- Founded: June 25, 1917; 108 years ago
- Headquarters: Higashi-Gotanda, Shinagawa-ku, Tokyo 141-8627, Japan
- Key people: Ichio Otsuka (President)
- Products: Metal, plastic, glass and paper packaging products; Steel plate products; Functional materials; Packaging machinery
- Revenue: ▲JPY 785.2 billion (FY 2017) (US$ $7.3 billion) (FY 2017)
- Net income: ▼JPY-24.7 billion (FY 2017) (US$ -232 million) (FY 2017)
- Number of employees: 18,419 (consolidated, as of March 31, 2018)
- Website: Official website

Toyo Seikan Group Holdings, Ltd. (東洋製罐グループホールディングス株式会社, Tōyō Seikan Gurūpu Hōrudingusu Kabushiki-gaisha) (formerly known as Toyo Seikan Kaisha, Ltd.) is a Japan-based packaging container manufacturing company.

It became a holding company in 2013, taking the name Toyo Seikan Group Holdings Ltd. As of March 2013, the company has 78 subsidiary and nine affiliate companies. It is listed on the first section of the Tokyo Stock Exchange and the Osaka Securities Exchange and was a constituent of the Nikkei 225 stock index.

== Business segments and products ==
- Packaging business
  - Metal, plastic, glass and paper containers
  - Aerosol and general filling products
- Steel-plate related business
  - Steel plates and related steel-plate-processed products
- Machinery and equipment business
  - Container manufacturing equipment and filling & seaming equipment

The Group also engages in the manufacturing and sales of hard alloys, raw material products for agriculture, sales of petroleum products, non-life insurance agency business and real estate management.
