= Matsuura Machinery =

Japanese machine tool manufacturing company

Matsuura Machinery Corporation

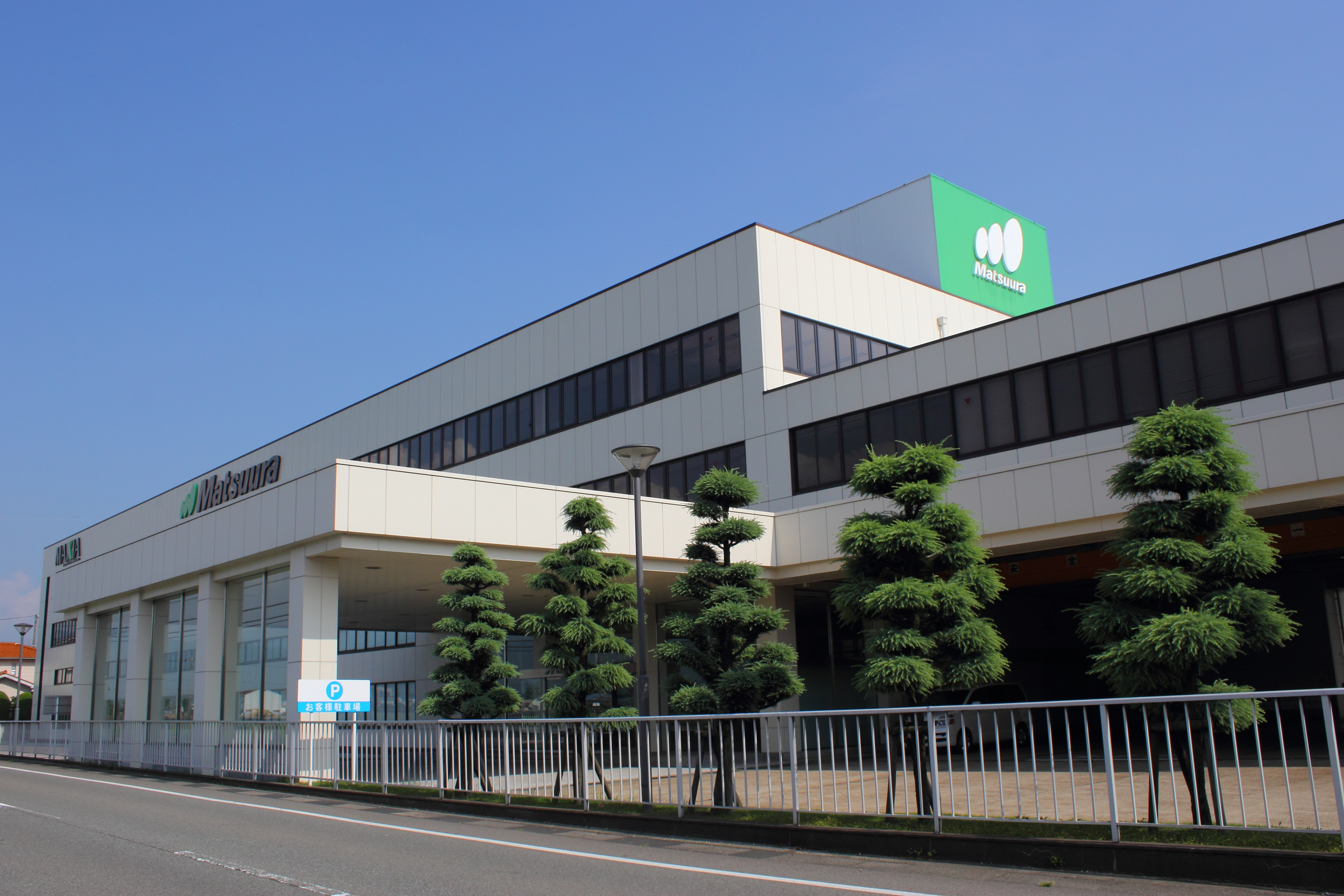
- Matsuura Machinery Corporation HQ
- Native name: 株式会社松浦機械製作所
- Company type: Private KK
- Industry: Machinery
- Founded: August 1935; 90 years ago
- Headquarters: Fukui-city 910-8530, Japan
- Area served: Worldwide
- Key people: Katsutoshi Matsuura (President)
- Products: Machining centers; 3D printers
- Revenue: JPY 16.3 billion (FY 2018) (US$ 150 million)
- Number of employees: 400 (consolidated, as of March 25, 2019)
- Website: Official website

Matsuura Machinery Corporation (株式会社松浦機械製作所, Kabushiki-kaisha Matsuura Kikai Seisakusho) is a machine tool manufacturing company based in Fukui, Fukui Prefecture, Japan, in operation since August 1935.

== History ==
Matsuura Machinery began as a manufacturer and distributor of lathes in 1935. Production of milling machines began in 1957, and the company went public in 1960. Production of automatic-controlled milling machines began in 1961 and numerically controlled milling machines from 1964. Production of automatically controlled drilling machines began in 1972, and vertical machining centers from 1974.

The company began exporting to the United States from 1975. In 1981, Matsuura Machinery began production of high-speed machining centers and twin-spindle vertical machining centers, and horizontal machining centers from 1983. The total number of machining centers shipped surpassed 10,000 units in 1993 and 20,000 in 2015.

== Use ==
The company's machining centers are used in a variety of industries, among them aerospace equipment manufacturers. Machine tools manufactured by Matsuura were used by NASA on the Space Shuttle Discovery's fuel tanks in 1998, making them four tons lighter than before.

== See also ==
- Bullard Machine Tool Company
