= Toyo Rikagaku Kenkyusho =

Toyo Rikagaku Kenkyusho Co., Ltd.
- Industry: Metalworking
- Founded: Niigata (April 5, 1950)
- Headquarters: Niigata, Japan
- Key people: Kunihiko Hongo, CEO
- Number of employees: 500 (2004)

Toyo Rikagaku Kenkyusho, Ltd (東陽理化学研究所) is a Japanese company based in Tsubame-City, Niigata, whose core business is metalworking technologies.
