= Swans (eyewear) =

- Swans brand logo
- Product type: Eyewear
- Current owner: Yamamoto Kogaku, Co., Ltd.
- Country: Japan
- Introduced: (1971; 55 years ago)
- Markets: Worldwide
- Tagline: Protecting for You
- Website: Official website

Yamamoto Kogaku, Co., Ltd.
- Native name: 山本光学株式会社
- Type: Private KK
- Industry: Apparel
- Founded: (1911; 115 years ago)
- Founder: Haruji Yamamoto
- Headquarters: Higashiosaka City, Osaka Prefecture, 577-0056, Japan
- Area served: Worldwide
- Key people: Tamenobu Yamamoto (Chairman and CEO); Naoyuki Yamamoto (President and COO)
- Products: Sporting and protective eyewear; Sunglasses; Optical devices; Motorcycle helmets
- Website: Official website

Swans (スワンズ, Suwanzu) is the brandname of the Japanese eyewear manufacturer Yamamoto Kogaku Co., Ltd. (山本光学株式会社, Yamamoto Kōgaku Kabushiki-gaisha) located in Osaka, Japan.

Founded in 1911, the company produces and sells optical lenses, sunglasses, goggles, as well as safety glasses. The sports eyewear brand Swans includes sunglasses, ski and snowboard goggles, swimming goggles, as well as helmets.

The company was founded by Haruji Yamamoto, as Yamamoto Optical Lens Factory, in Osaka. The factory moved to Higashiōsaka in 1935, where the company's current headquarters are. In that same year started the production of lenses and eyewear for protection against dust. Twenty years later the company name changed to Yamamoto Bojin Megane and started the production of eyewear frames by plastic molding, a first in Japan. In 1977 the company became as an official ski equipment supplier to the United States Ski Team and in 1980 the company's took its current name.

In October 2014, the Toshiba Glass, a pair of optical head-mounted display-like glasses, which was jointly created by Yamamoto Kogaku and Toshiba, was unveiled at CEATEC 2014.

Swans was the official supplier of the World Para Swimming Championships from 2017 to 2019.

In 2021, the table tennis player Jun Mizutani wore indoor competition glasses during the Olympics, a first in this competition, with glasses that were custom-designed by Swans for the table tennis player.
