= Shindengen Electric Manufacturing =

Japanese company

Shindengen Electric Manufacturing Co., Ltd.
- Native name: 新電元工業株式会社
- Company type: Public (K.K)
- Traded as: TYO: 6844
- ISIN: JP3377800002
- Industry: Electrical equipment
- Founded: August 16, 1949; 76 years ago
- Headquarters: Ōtemachi, Chiyoda-ku, Tokyo 100-0004, Japan
- Area served: Worldwide
- Key people: Yoshinori Suzuki (President)
- Products: Power semiconductors; Electric equipment; Power supply products
- Revenue: ▲JPY 92.1 billion (FY 2017) (US$ 867 million) (FY 20177)
- Net income: ▲JPY 5.2 billion (FY 2017) (US$ 50 million) (FY 2017)
- Number of employees: 4,956 (consolidated, as of March 31, 2018)
- Website: Official website

Shindengen Electric Manufacturing (新電元工業株式会社, Shindengen Kōgyō Kabushiki-gaisha) is a Japanese, Tokyo-based company, manufacturing power semiconductor devices, electric power systems, automotive electronics products and solenoid products. It is listed on the Tokyo Stock Exchange and the company's largest shareholder is Honda.

It has a subsidiary in North America called Shindengen America Inc. which was founded in February 1987 in California.

== History ==
The origins of Shindengen go back to Dengensha, a manufacturer of electric stoves and rectifiers founded in 1935. In 1944, Dengen Kogyo Co., Ltd. was created by Dengensha to meet the high demand for selenium rectifiers for use by the military during the war in the Pacific. After the war, the company continued to produce rectifiers for both the private and public sectors, but also added direct current power supplies to its production line.

In 1949, Shindengen Electric Manufacturing Co., Ltd. was established as a successor to Dengen Kogyo, whose 465 employees were transferred to the new company, along with 5 million yen start-up capital. In 1952, with the introduction of alloy-type transistors made from germanium, silicon, and other materials, Shidengen's semiconductor research and development worked to create germanium based transistors. By 1957, the company had improved its transistors for use in rectification. During this time the first silicon thyristors were introduced. The following year the company opened offices in Osaka and was also listed in the Tokyo Stock Exchange. In 1960, Shindengen completed work on its thyristor prototypes and sales of its 16A/400V line started the following year and in 1964, the office in Nagoya was opened in April.

In the 1990’s, Shindengen began rapidly expanding, not only in Japan, but also in Southeast Asia, where there was a growing market for two-wheeled vehicles. In 1991, the company established a production plant near Chiang Mai in the northern Thailand province of Lumphun. The facility was built to increase overseas production of semiconductors. July 2017 marked a new beginning for the company as its September 1951 diode motif logo was changed to the current “New power. Your power.” logo as a means to capture the ideals of its management philosophy, corporate mission, and action agenda, to include its new, “Listen closely, look ahead, and create a future of value" pledge.

== Business segments and products ==
The Company operates in three business segments:

- Power semiconductor manufacturing
  - diode bridges
  - general rectifying diodes (rectifier), high-speed diodes and other diodes
  - power management integrated circuit (power ICs), power MOSFETs and insulated-gate bipolar transistors
- Power system products
  - DC-to-DC converters, AC-to-DC converters and power inverters
- Automotive electronics products
  - regulator (automatic control) and CDI
  - DC-to-DC converters
  - sine wave inverters, ECUs
