= Balmuda =

Japanese product manufacturing company

Balmuda K. K.
- Native name: バルミューダ株式会社
- Company type: Public
- Traded as: TYO: 6612
- Industry: Product design; Consumer electronics
- Founded: 2003; 23 years ago
- Founder: Gen Terao
- Headquarters: Musashino, Tokyo, Japan
- Number of employees: 100
- Website: www.balmuda.co.jp

Balmuda K. K. (バルミューダ株式会社), stylized BALMUDA, is a Japanese design and manufacturing company that produces small appliances and computer accessories. Its products have won international recognition for their designs, including Red Dot and iF Product Design awards. The story behind one of the company's early products was adapted for television in the NHK drama Half Blue Sky.

== History ==
Balmuda was founded in Tokyo in 2003 by Gen Terao, a high-school dropout who pursued a music career for several years before starting Balmuda as a product design company. The company's first product was the Floater, an aluminum laptop stand that Macworld praised for its design while noting that buyers would be "definitely paying—a lot—for the unique design and the production process".

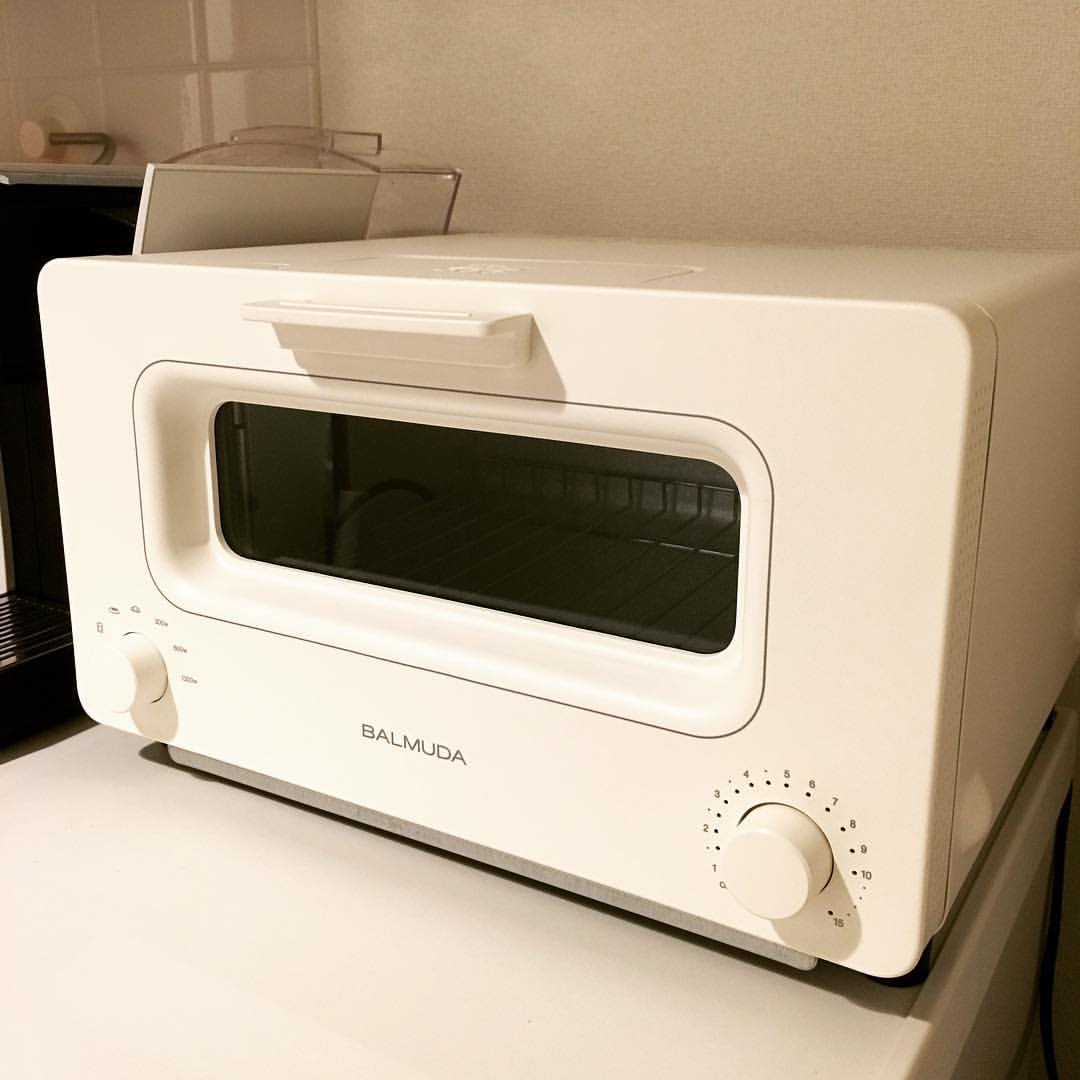
A Balmuda "The Toaster" toaster

After nearly going bankrupt during the late-2000s recession, in 2010 the company launched the GreenFan, a home air circulation fan that Terao had designed to eliminate the strong air currents resulting from traditional bladed fan designs. Terao claims that the idea for the fan, which combines two different blade systems operating at different speeds, came from watching children linking arms and trying to run in a circle, and noting what happened when faster and slower children were linked together. The story of Balmuda's development of the GreenFan product was later adapted by NHK for a series of episodes in the 98th asadora Half Blue Sky.

Balmuda has since introduced several more small appliances, including a toaster, a microwave oven, an electric kettle, and a rice cooker, with Balmuda providing product design and distribution but all manufacturing outsourced to other companies. The toaster oven, called "The Toaster" and introduced in 2015, was not initially advertised to consumers, but sold so quickly that customers had to wait three months to get their product. The company has also developed a signature food product, BALMUDA The Curry, intended to be prepared with Balmuda appliances.

The company announced its expansion into Europe in 2013. In 2017 Balmuda opened its first retail store, located in Tokyo's Ginza neighborhood. As of 2018 it had over 100 employees. Balmuda went public on the Tokyo Stock Exchange in December 2020, with an initial surge in stock price in anticipation of its entry into the smartphone market, but the company halted sales of its phone product at the start of 2022 due to poor reviews and general consumer disappointment, leading to a sharp drop in share price.

== Product design ==
Balmuda has drawn comparisons to Apple Inc. for its approach to "turning humidifiers, toasters, and space heaters into objects of desire". The original GreenFan received a Red Dot Award and iF Product Design Award. Several subsequent products have also received iF Design Awards, including two Gold Awards. Balmuda's product design has been imitated by other manufacturers, and the company has taken legal action to challenge products of apparently similar design, such as air purifiers produced by Chinese manufacturer Xiaomi.
