= Genista Corporation =

Company that used computational models of human visual and auditory systems

- Type: Private
- Industry: Software
- Founded: 2000
- Founder: Kambiz Homayounfar
- Headquarters: Tokyo, Japan
- Area served: Worldwide
- Products: Optimacy (Media Quality Control Station), PQoS (Portable Quality Probe), Agent (Post-Deployment Quality Monitoring), SDK (Libraries and API for OEM
- Website: Genista.com (defunct, archived here)

Genista Corporation was a company that used computational models of human visual and auditory systems to measure what human viewers see and hear. The company offered quality measurement technology that estimated the experienced quality that would be measured by a mean opinion score (MOS) resulting from subjective tests using actual human test subjects.

Digital video systems exploit properties of the human visual system to reduce the bit rate at which a video sequence is coded. Video quality assessment tools based on network quality metrics such as packet loss, MDI, and PSNR do not correlate well with a perceived visual quality due to the nonlinear behavior of the human visual system. As a result, accurate prediction of the perceived quality of the output video should also take the human visual system properties into account.

Genista Corporation's patented technology was the result of research done by Stefan Winkler in the field of vision models and metrics. Details on his work can be found in his book: Digital Video Quality, Stefan Winkler, Wiley, March 2005, ISBN 0-470-02404-6.

In June 2007, Genista became part of Symmetricom's QoE Assurance Division.

== See also ==
- Mean opinion score
- Video quality
- Digital video
