= Eco Marine Power =

Energy company in Japan

- Company type: Incentive
- Founded: 2010 as Eco Marine Power.
- Headquarters: Japan
- Number of locations: Fukuoka, Japan
- Area served: Worldwide
- Website: www.ecomarinepower.com

Eco Marine Power, a company based in Fukuoka, Japan, develops and markets renewable energy based systems for ships and other vessels. The company's technologies use wind, solar and electric power to develop more energy efficient vessels with smaller carbon footprints.

Founded in July 2010 in Fukuoka, Japan by Ohori Capital, Eco Marine Power aims to provide green power options for vessels and ships. The company is currently bring to market a system that can be used on larger vessels such as bulk carriers and cruise liners. This patented system is known as Aquarius MRE (Marine Renewable Energy).

Eco Marine Power has been internationally recognised for its innovative designs & solutions. The company been nominated for a number of awards including the Katerva Awards (2012) and Sustainable Shipping Awards (2011). It was also the recipient of a 2012 Solutions Inspiring Action Award from the Savannah Oceans Exchange.

== Aquarius Project ==
In July 2010, Eco Marine Power started a project to create a system for use in large vessels that utilizes wind power and solar energy. Being designed for installation on existing vessels, the system will require little maintenance from ships’ crews. A prototype of the system, scheduled for release in early 2018, will be tested and evaluated on the ocean before receiving a full commercial release. The company announced in February 2011 that they would continue working on the project after completing a successful feasibility study. In 2016 the company announced it had been granted a patent covering elements of its renewable energy system for ships - Aquarius MRE.

== Aquarius Marine Renewable Energy ==
The patented Aquarius Marine Renewable Energy (MRE) is an advanced integrated system of rigid sails, marine-grade solar panels, energy storage modules, charging system and marine computers that enables ships to tap into renewable energy by harnessing the power provided by the wind and sun. The array of rigid sails are automatically positioned by a computer system to best suit the prevailing weather conditions and can be lowered and stored when not in use or in bad weather. The rigid sails are based on EMP's EnergySail® technology and these renewable energy devices can even be used when a ship is at anchor or in harbour. Each EnergySail can be configured with a mix of sensors, photovoltaic panels or other power generation devices. Clearly the EnergySail is unlike any other sail. For more information see:Aquarius MRE

On the 26th May 2021, ClassNK of Japan granted AiP to “Aquarius Marine Renewable Energy with EnergySail”.

== Aquarius Marine Solar Power ==
In 2015 the company deployed the first of its marine solar power solutions for ships - Aquarius Marine Solar Power. The first system was installed on a high speed car and passenger ferry in Greece. The ship was the Blue Star Delos and is owned and operated by Blue Star Ferries. Aquarius Marine Solar Power Gets Class Approval

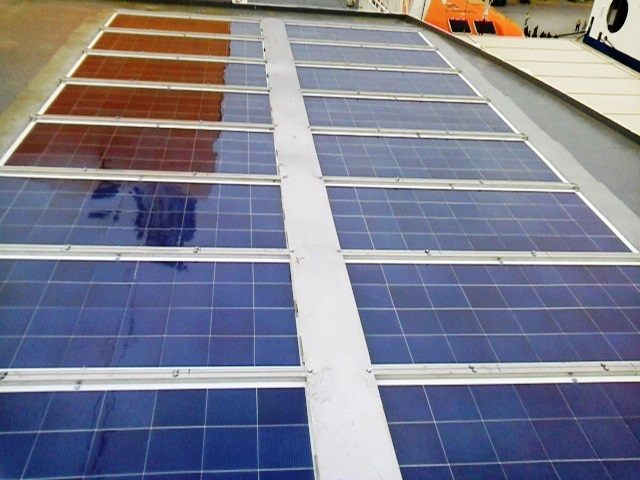
Solar panel array installed as part of an Aquarius MAS + Solar solution provided by Eco Marine Power.

== Aquarius Eco Ship ==
The Aquarius Eco Ship is a low emission design concept that incorporates EMP's technologies along with fuel cells. low power lighting and other energy efficiency measures. The design concept is based on a large bulk carrier or general cargo ship but could also be applied to other ship types such as Pure Car and Truck Carriers (PCTC), Roll On/Roll Off vessels (RoRo) or oil and LNG tankers. A central feature of the concept is the use of EMP's Aquarius MRE system which brings together rigid sails, energy storage, solar power and computer automation technologies. Other companies involved in the project include Teramoto Iron Works, The Furukawa Battery Company and KEI System.

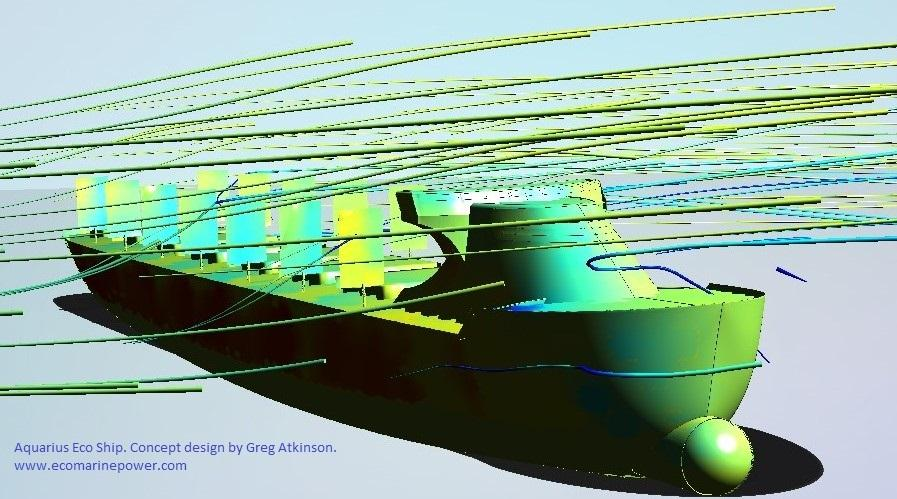
Analysis of airflow around rigid sails on Aquarius Eco Ship. This concept design incorporates Aquarius MRE - a renewable energy system for ships developed by Eco Marine Power,

== Tonbo HMP Ferry ==
In January 2011, the company unveiled a detailed design for its new Tonbo HMP ferry, with a 250-person carrying capacity, aimed at the tourist vessel market. The ship uses lithium batteries that are charged from solar panels on its roof, and also includes an onboard biofuel generator. The Tonbo's solar panels allow the ship to travel in areas with bridges. The energy management system on the ship is designed to provide a healthy return on investment.

== Partnerships ==
Eco Marine Power (EMP) partners include KEI System, Teramoto Iron Works and The Furukawa Battery Company. The Furukawa Battery Company provides batteries for EMP's Aquarius Marine Solar Power and Aquarius MRE. KEI System co-develops monitoring & automation systems with EMP and Teramoto Iron Works is the manufacturing center for battery frames, solar panels frames and the EnergySail®.

In partnership with Ohori Capital, Eco Marine Power is promoting environmentally friendly marine power solutions in Japan and globally.

== Advisory board ==
- Yoshitaka Teramoto [President - Teramoto Iron Works Co. Ltd.]
- Hidenori Matsumoto [Certified Public Accountant]
- Akihito Suzuki [CEO - ELT Inc]
- Greg Atkinson [Founder & Chief Technology Officer - Eco Marine Power]

Source: Eco Marine Power Advisory Board

== See also ==
- Green methanol
