= Work Wheels =

Japanese wheel manufacturer

Work Co., Ltd.

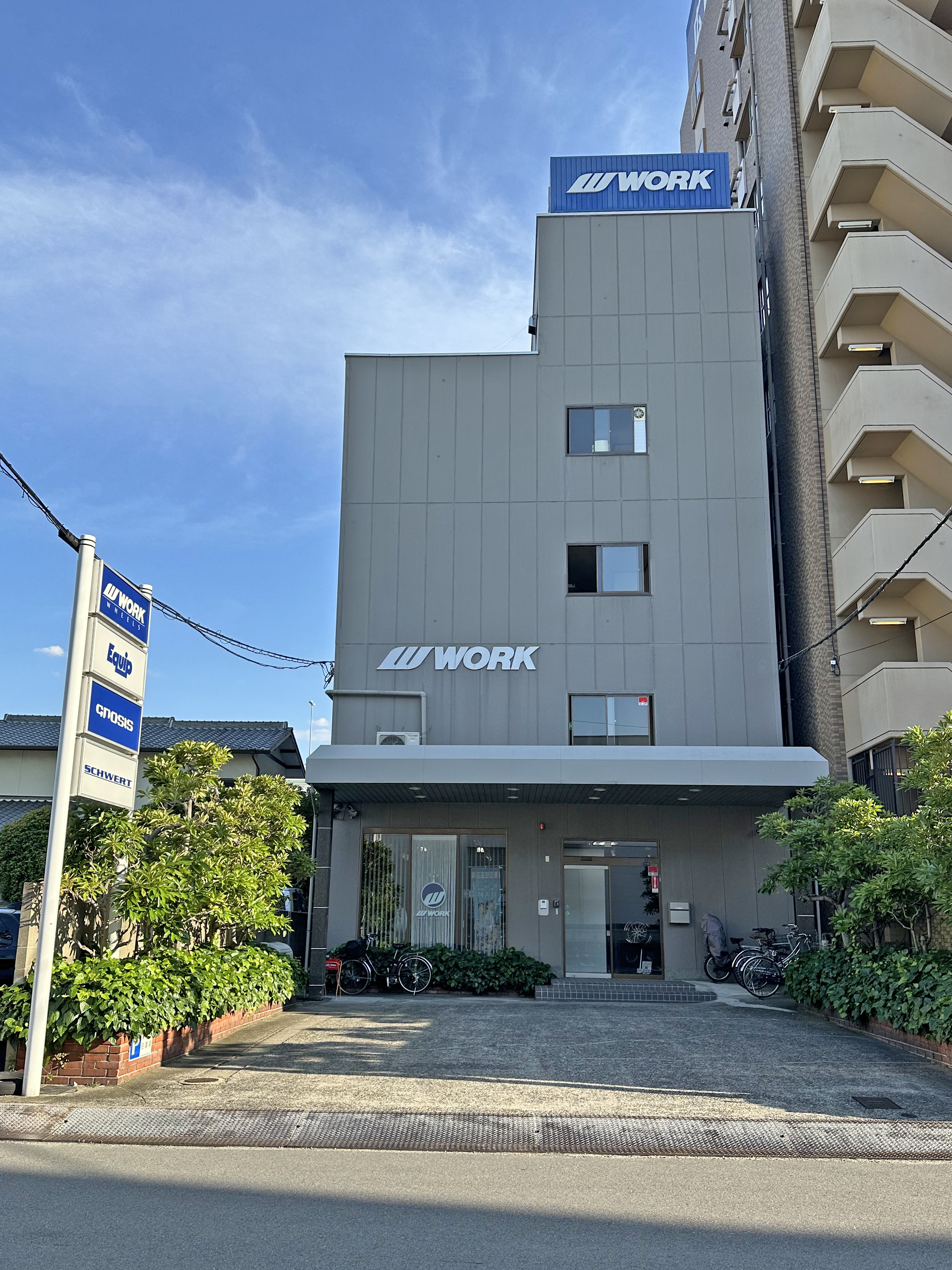
- Headquarters in Osaka, Japan
- Native name: 株式会社ワーク
- Romanized name: Kabushiki-gaisha Wāku
- Type: Private
- Industry: Motorsport
- Founded: March 8, 1977
- Founder: Takeshi Tanaka
- Headquarters: Osaka, Japan
- Products: Alloy wheels
- Revenue: ¥JPY 95,000,000 (June 2014)
- Number of employees: 160 (June 2014)
- Website: www.work-wheels.net

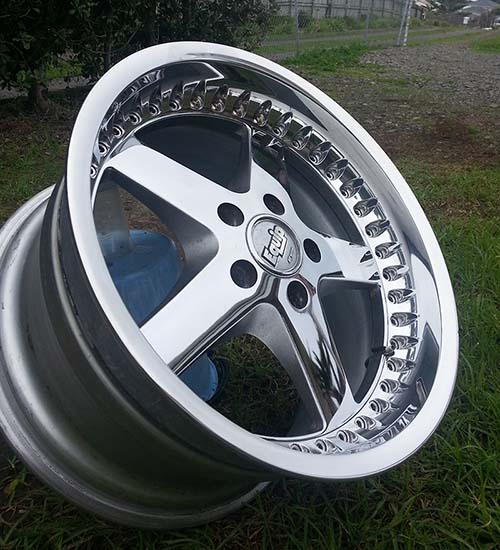
Work Equip E05

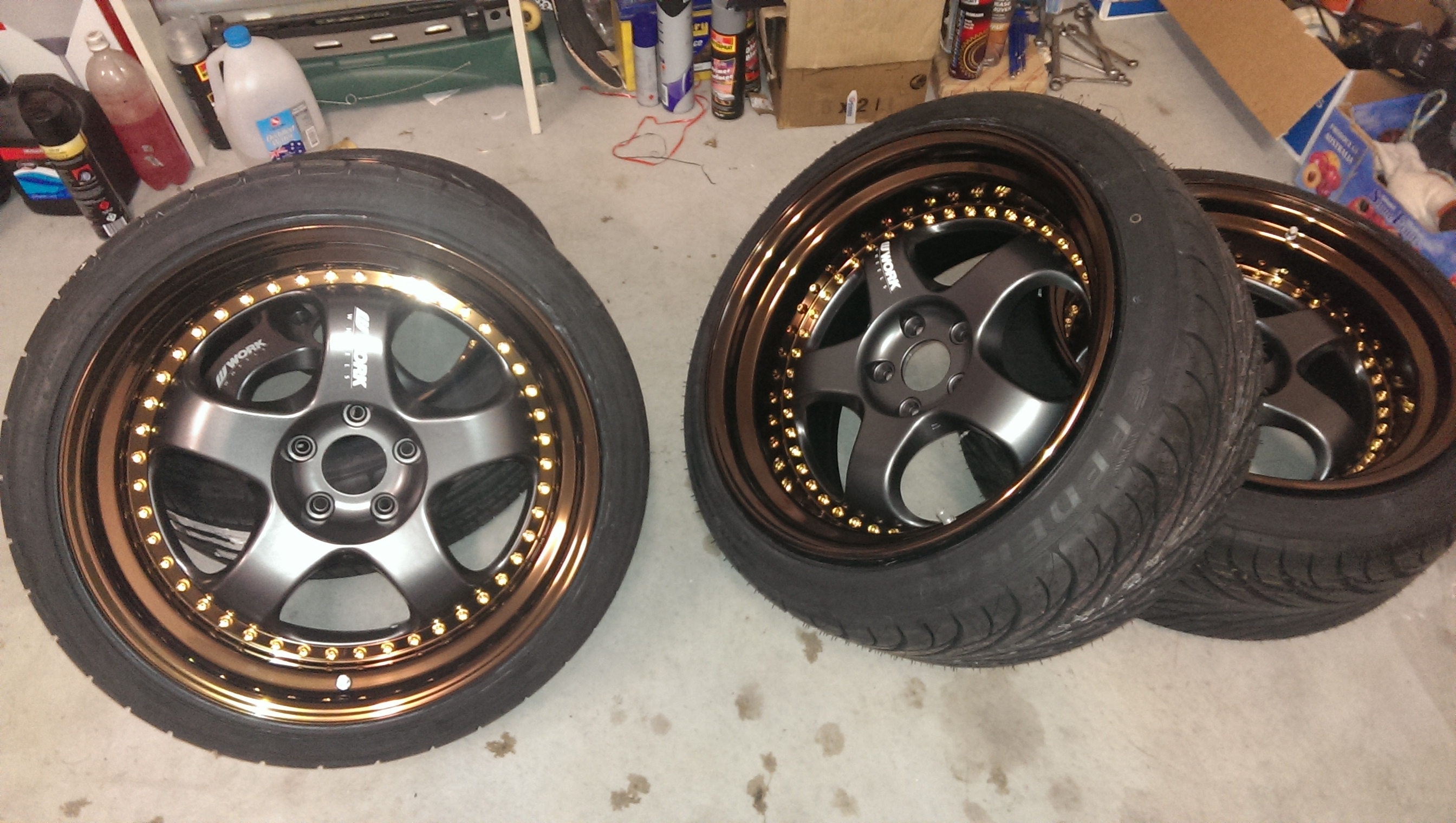
Work Meister S1 3P

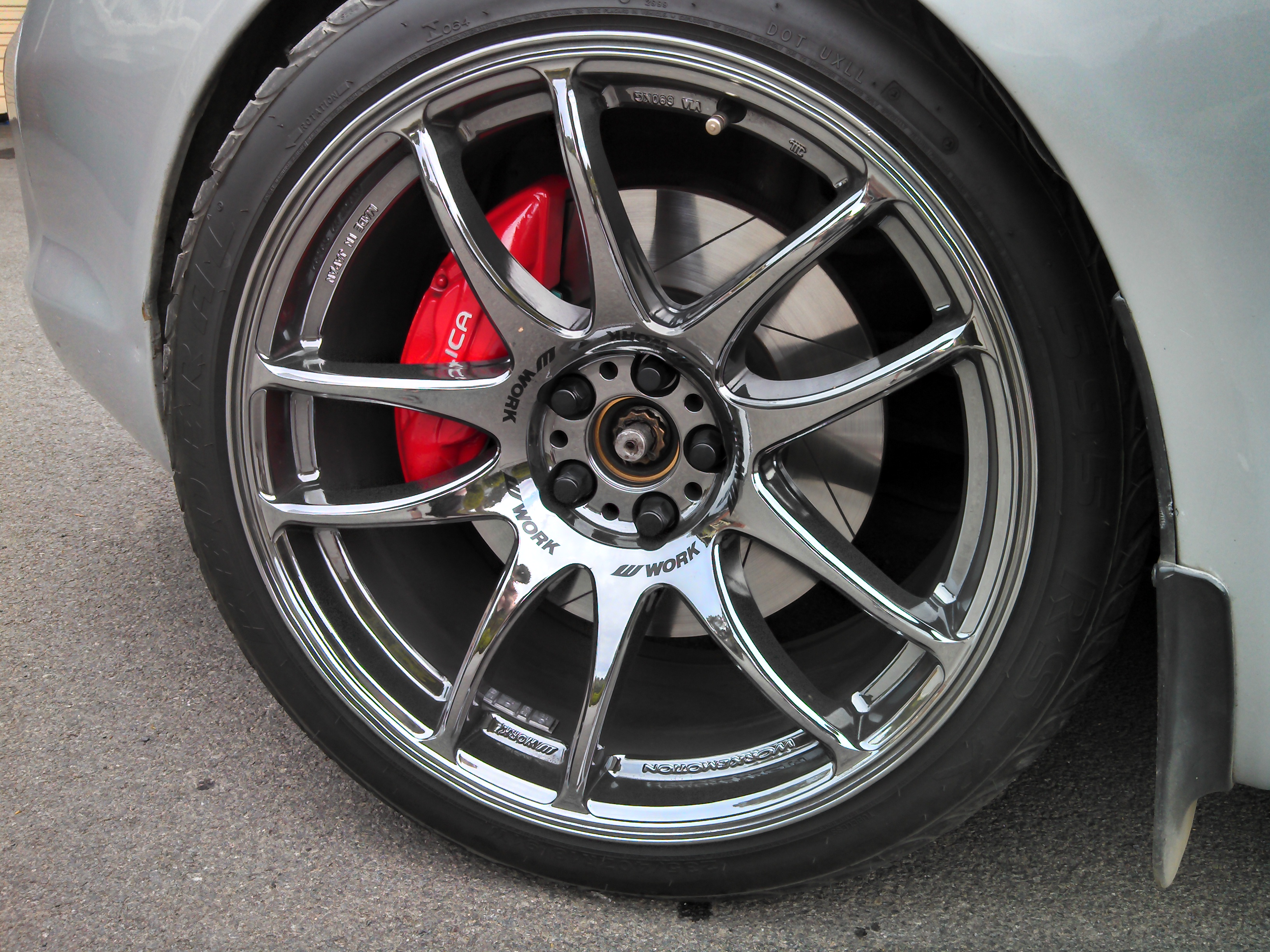
Work Emotion CR Kiwami

Work Co., Ltd. is a Japanese wheel manufacturer for both motorsport and street use, such as the popular "Work Equip" and "Work Meister" range of wheels.

Work Wheels released their first range of wheels in 1977 under the name "Work Equip", which continue to be manufactured today under popular demand. Work Wheels manufactures Single, Two and Three piece forged wheels for automotive use, and adopted an "on demand system" in order to produce products under direct request of their customers and corporate customers. Current major corporate customers include Dunlop, Falken, Toyo Tires, Toyota Modellista International Co, FUJI Corporation, Bridgestone, and Ralliart.

Work Wheels is a long-standing member of both the Japan Light-Alloy Wheel Association (JAWA) and Japan External Trade Organization (JETRO).

The company's founder, Takeshi Tanaka, died in 2015.

== Current lines ==
- Equip
  - E05
  - E10
- LS
  - VAJRA SUV
  - VAJRA
  - ADAMAS
- VS
  - VS-XX
  - VS-XV
  - VS-KF #
- Emitz
- Zeast
  - STX
  - ST1
  - ST2
  - BST1
  - BST2
- Gnosis FMB
  - FMB03
  - FMB02
  - FMB01
- Gnosis CV
  - CVX
  - CVS
  - CVF
- Lanvec
  - LM1
- SCHWERT
  - QUELL
  - GLASON
  - BRUNNEN
  - SCHWERT SG2
  - SCHWERT SG1
- Emotion
  - CR 2P
  - T7R
  - T7R 2P
  - T5R 2P
  - CR Kiwami
  - D9R
  - T5R
  - M8R
  - CR 3P
  - ZR10 2P
  - ZR10
  - RS11
  - ZR7
- Meister
  - M1 3P
  - S1 3P
  - CR01
  - S1 2P
  - S1 SUV
  - L1 3P
- MCO Racing
  - Type CS
- Equip
  - 40
  - 03
  - 01
- Seeker
  - FX
  - CX
  - DT
  - FD
  - MX
- CRAG
  - GALVATRE
  - T-Grabic
  - S1J
  - BJS
- Goocars
  - Hemi
- Zistance
  - W10M
  - W5S

=== Discontinued lines ===
- Arkline
- Astley
- Balmung
- Brombacher
- Durandal
- Euroline
- Nezart
- Pietra
- Promising
- Ryver
- Rezax
- Rusttere
- Script
- Sporbo
- Steez
- Urbanzone
- Varianza
- WIL (Work Import Label)
- XSA

== History ==
Work Wheels timeline:

Year	Event
1977	President Takeshi Tanaka started WORK Co,. Ltd Company capital JPY 4,000,000
1979	Established 3 piece wheel assembly plant. Increased Company capital to JPY 10,000,000.
1980	Built current 4-story head office. Relocated and expanded factory.
1981	Established paint facility.
1982	Established delivery center next to assembly plant. Increased company capital to JPY 18,000,000-
1983	Established Racing Sec. factory. Opened branch in Fukuoka, Japan. Opened branch in Kanagawa, Japan.
1984	Opened branches in Sendai, Japan and Hiroshima, Japan.
1986	Established assembly and delivery factory in Shiki, Japan.
1987	Opened automotive division dedicated to selling imported vehicles.
1988	Established painting line. Established rim manufacturing factory in Okayama, Japan.
1989	Opened branch in Nagoya, Japan. Expanded factory in Okayama, Japan.
1990	Opened AMP as the Planning and Development Sec.
1991	Established delivery / storage center in Okayama, Japan.
1992	Established casting factory in Okayama, Japan. Opened branch in Takamatsu, Japan.
1993	Opened branch in Niigata, Japan. Opened branch in Omiya, Japan. Opened branch in Sapporo, Japan. Opened branch in Kanazana, Japan.
1998	Established photo studio.
1999	Established prototype trial line.
2000	Increased company capital to JPY 18,950,000-. Established factory in Sakai, Japan for rim manufacturing, assembly and delivery
2001	Increased company capital to JPY 95,000,000
2002	Increased company capital to JPY 137,025,000
2003	Acquired the certificate of Quality Management System ISO 9001

== Notable products ==
- Euroline
- Equip
- Rezax
- Workemotion
- Meister
- CR2P
- VSXX
- VSKF
- S13P
- S1R
- CR Kai
- Autostrada Modena
