= AOC Holdings =

Japanese oil and natural gas company

AOC Holdings (now Fuji Oil Company)
- Native name: 富士石油
- Type: Privately held
- Industry: Oil and natural gas
- Founded: 2003
- Headquarters: Tokyo, Japan
- Key people: Fumio Sekiya (Chairman and Representative Director) Atsuo Shibota (President and Representative Director)
- Services: Exploring, developing, producing, selling, buying and refining oil and natural gas
- Revenue: 425.5 billion Yen
- Operating income: 8.7 billion Yen
- Net income: 9.4 billion Yen
- Number of employees: FOC only: 441 (as of March 31, 2016) Consolidated: 657 (as of March 31, 2016)
- Website: http://www.foc.co.jp

AOC Holdings (AOCホールディングス株式会社, Eiōshī Hōrudingusu Kabushiki-gaisha) (TYO: 5017) is a large Japanese oil and natural gas company based in Tokyo, Japan and specialised in exploring, developing, producing, selling, buying and refining oil and natural gas. AOC Holdings owns several large companies like the Arabian Oil Company, Norske AEDC and AOC Egypt Petroleum Company that operate and manage oil and gas fields in different parts of the world and the Fuji Oil Company that owns the Sodegaura Refinery with a capacity of 192,000 bbl/d (30,500 m^{3}/d). It is partially owned by Idemitsu Kosan
