= List of computer security companies =

There are various companies that provide computer security services, develop computer security software or resell software exploits.

== List ==
- Absolute Security
- ADF Solutions
- Aikido Security
- Altor Networks
- Anonymizer (company)
- Arctic Wolf Networks
- ARX (company)
- AuthenTec
- Barracuda Networks
- Bitdefender
- BlueTalon
- Bromium
- Bugcrowd
- Canon IT Solutions
- Cato Networks
- Check Point
- Checkmarx
- Chronicle Security
- Clavister
- Cobalt Labs
- Columbitech
- Comodo Cybersecurity
- Core Security Technologies
- Credant Technologies
- Critical Start
- CronLab
- Crossbeam Systems
- CrowdStrike
- Cryptek
- CyberArk
- Cybereason
- CyberHound
- CyberTrust
- Cylance
- Cynet (company)
- Cyveillance
- DarkTrace
- Dasient
- Datto (company)
- Deep Instinct
- Druva
- Emsisoft
- ESafe
- ESET
- Exabeam
- F5, Inc.
- Fastly
- Finjan Holdings
- Fluid Attacks
- Forcepoint
- Forter
- Fortinet
- G Data CyberDefense
- Gen Digital
- General Dynamics Mission Systems
- Guardian Analytics
- HackerOne
- HBGary
- ImmuniWeb
- Impermium
- Imprivata
- InfoSec Institute
- Infysec
- IID (company)
- InterWorking Labs
- IOActive
- Itochu Techno-Solutions
- JAL Infotec
- Kaspersky Lab
- Lastline
- Librem
- Loggly
- LogLogic
- LogRhythm
- Mile2
- Mitsui Knowledge Industry
- Mocana
- NEC
- Netcraft
- NetScreen Technologies
- Netwitness
- Nexor
- NitroSecurity
- Nomura Research Institute
- NowSecure
- NS Solutions
- OneLogin
- OneSpan
- OpenText
- Optenet
- Optiv
- Palo Alto Networks
- Penta Security
- Pine64
- Ping Identity
- PrivateCore
- Prolexic Technologies
- Quick Heal
- Quantum eMotion
- Rapid7
- RiskIQ
- RSA Security
- SCSK
- Secunet Security Networks
- Secureworks
- Sendio
- SentinelOne
- Skyhigh Security
- Snyk
- SonicWall
- Sony Global Solutions
- Sophos
- Splunk
- SQ1 Security
- Stonesoft Corporation
- Sumo Logic
- Synack
- Synopsys
- Tanium
- Tenable, Inc.
- ThreatConnect
- TitanFile
- Tiversa
- Trend Micro
- Trusteer
- Tufin
- Uniadex
- Vectra AI
- Venafi
- VMware Carbon Black
- WatchGuard
- Web Sheriff
- World Informatix Cyber Security
- Xetron
- YesWeHack
- Zerodium
- Zscaler
