= NS Solutions =

Japanese IT company

NS Solutions Corp.
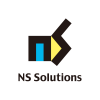
- Native name: 日鉄ソリューションズ 株式会社
- Type: Public
- Traded as: TYO: 2327
- Industry: Information technology
- Founded: 1980
- Headquarters: Tokyo, Japan
- Key people: Munetaka Shashiki
- Services: System integration Cloud computing Information security IT lifecycle support
- Revenue: JPY 218.6 billion
- Total assets: JPY 175.6 billion
- Number of employees: 2,817 (2016)
- Parent: Nippon Steel
- Website: Official Website

NS Solutions Corp. (日鉄ソリューションズ株式会社, Nittetsu Soryūshonzu Kabushiki-gaisha; Nippon Steel Solutions Corporation) is a Japanese company headquartered in Tokyo, Japan, that offers IT services, system integration, cloud computing, and information security.

== Overview ==
In 1980, Nippon Steel Computer System Corp. was established by Nippon Steel Corp. After several computer system companies and divisions in Nippon Steel group were merged, NS Solutions Corp. was established in 2001. In 2012, Nippon Steel Corp. and Sumitomo Metal Industries Ltd. were merged into Nippon Steel & Sumitomo Metal Corp. The company name remains as NS Solutions Corp. in English.

The company offers system integration, cloud computing, information security, and IT lifecycle support in Japan. The services are mostly for enterprises and are separated from Nippon Steel & Sumitomo Metal group.

The business type and scope is similar to Itochu Techno-Solutions, SCSK and Uniadex. NS Solutions has established a partnership with Oracle, and invested Oracle Japan, since 1991. The company was listed on the Tokyo Stock Exchange 1st Section (2327.TYO) in October 2002.

In 2017, NS Solutions acquired Net Value Components Ltd., a company that offers network integration and operation.

== See also ==
- List of companies of Japan
