= Kimitsu Steel Works =

Steel factory in Japan

Coordinates: 35°21′17.8″N 139°52′28.2″E

The Aerial View of Kimitsu Steel Works, a composite photo of 36 photos from Geospatial Information Authority of Japan

Location of Kimitsu Steel Works

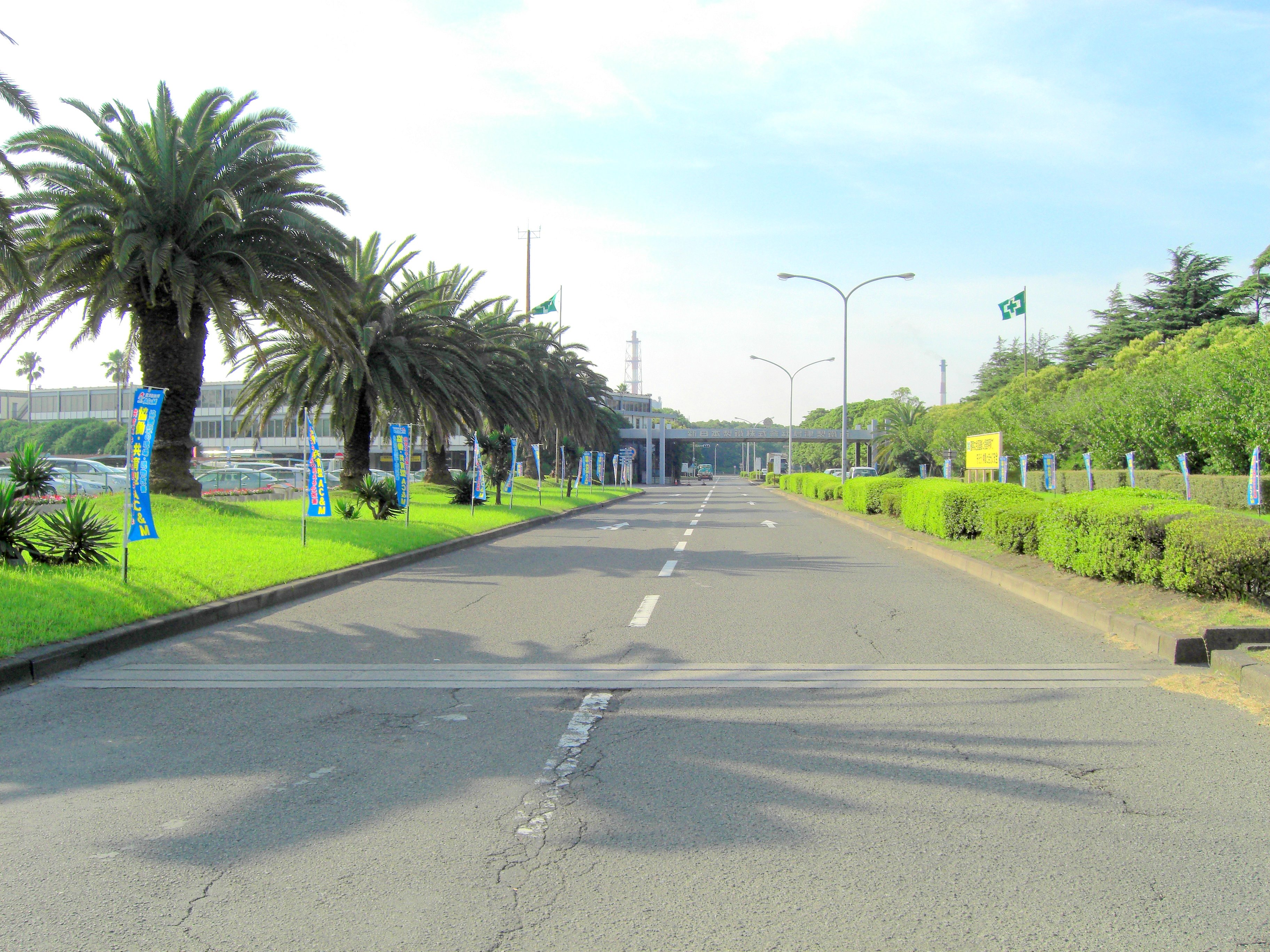
The Main Road from the Entrance of Kimitsu Steel Works

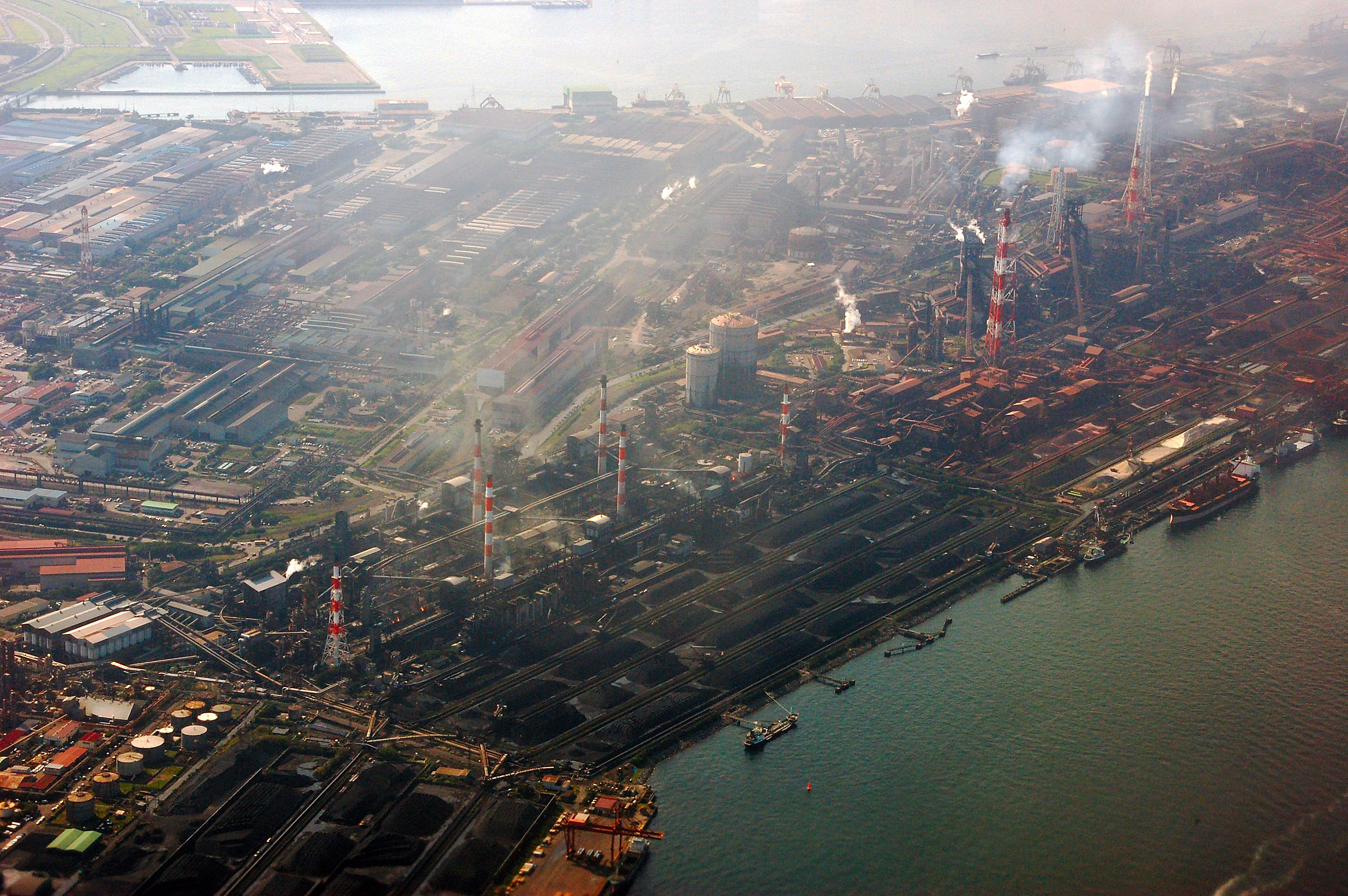
An Aerial Photo of Kimitsu Steel Works (October, 2007)

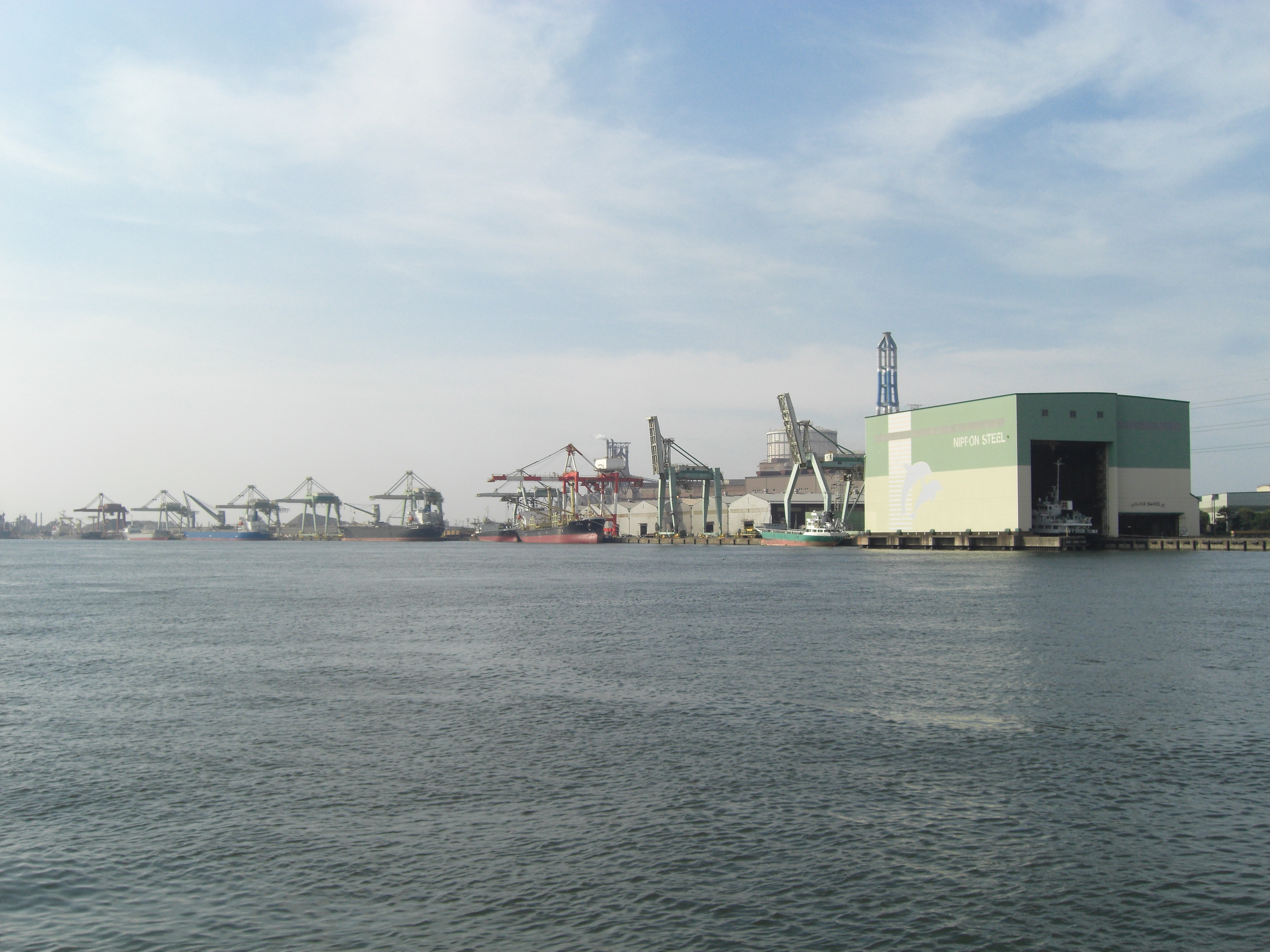
The west quays of Kimitsu Steel Works (October, 2007)

Kimitsu Steel Works (Japanese: 君津製鉄所) is an ironworks in Kimitsu, Chiba, Japan, established in 1965 by Nippon Steel Corporation (新日本製鐵), part of Nippon Steel & Sumitomo Metal Corporation after its 2012 merger with Sumitomo Metal Industries.

== History ==
Prior to the construction of its new ironworks, Nippon Steel considered the planned reclaimed land off the coast of Yokkaichi, Mie in Central Japan. Their market research, however, showed the steel demand coming largely from Eastern Japan, especially from the Tokyo-Kawasaki-Yokohama region on the western side of Tokyo Bay, and, therefore, Kimitsu, Chiba on the other side of the bay was selected as the new site.

Kimitsu Steel Works started in 1965 with a cold rolling mill, using the slabs shipped from other ironworks, such as Kamaishi Steel Works in Kamaishi, Iwate and Tokai Steel Works near Nagoya.

In 1968, 1969, 1971 and 1988, the first, second, third and fourth blast furnaces, respectively, were constructed, although the first blast furnace has stopped operation since 1976. Also constructed later were a hot rolling mill and iron bar/iron pipes mills. It became an "integrated" steel works, producing every kind of steel products.

In 1970, with the merger of Nippon Steel and Fuji Iron & Steel (both companies having been separated from the old semi-government-owned Nippon Steel - 日本製鐵 - since 1950 under the Allied Occupying Army's Anti-Zaibatsu policy immediately after World War II), it became Kimitsu Works of the new Corporation.

From the latter half of the 1970s, Kimitsu started to receive visits by the third world's engineers, thus giving technical assistance, as well as by the world's dignitaries, partly because it was located relatively near the capital city of Tokyo. In 1976, it was visited by Premier Jacques Chirac of France. In 1978, it received a visit by Vice Premier Deng Xiaoping of China, followed by Yu Qiuli's visit in 1979. In 1984, Kimitsu Works began receiving Chinese interns (a total of 500 people that year in different groups) from the planned Baoshan Steel Works in Shanghai. In 1985, with Kimitsu engineers' further assistance, Baoshan started operations with the first blast furnace began production.

In 1995, it had the honor of a visit by Emperor Akihito and Princess Michiko, his wife. Prince Naruhito, their son, also toured the works twenty years later, in 2015, visiting the No. 4 blast furnace, hot rolling mill and technology center.

In 2007, a coking facility began operation at Kimitsu.

In 2012, with the merger of Nippon Steel and Sumitomo Metal Industries, it has become Kimitsu Works of Nippon Steel & Sumitomo Metal Corporation.

== Extensive use of the computer ==
One of the features of this relatively new ironworks when it was planned was its extensive use of the computer, not for the administrative or scientific application, but for the planning and online real-time operation of each mill, called "KIIS" or "All Online System" by Nippon Steel, such operation having been pioneered by U.S. Steel's Homestead Steel Works. It was for the first time applied to an integrated steel works in Japan, a trend which was closely follows by other new steel works, such as Kobe Steel's Kakogawa Works, Sumitomo Metal Industries' Kashima Works (Kashima, Ibaraki), and Nippon Kokan's Ōgishima extension of Keihin Works (Kawasaki, Kanagawa).

== Data ==
- Space: 1,173 hectares
- Employees: about 2,600
- Annual pig iron production: 10,026,000 tons (2006), which was the second highest among the Japanese ironworks.

== Transportation ==
- From Kimitsu Station on East Japan Railway Company's Uchibō Line, Ten minutes by taxi
- From Tokyo Station's Yaesu Exit, via Tokyo Bay Aqua-Line, Keisei Bus or Nittō Bus
- From Haneda International Airport, sixty minutes by Keihin Express Limousine

== See also ==
- Nippon Steel & Sumitomo Metal Corporation
- Japan's Steel Works

== See also ==
- Keiyō Industrial Zone
