= Mesa J mine =

Iron ore mine in Western Australia

- Location in Western Australia
- Interactive map of Mesa J mine
- Location: Shire of Ashburton, Pilbara, Western Australia, Australia; 21°45′00″S 116°14′32″E
- Products: Iron ore
- Production: 7 million tonnes/annum
- Opened: 1994
- Company: Rio Tinto Iron Ore (53%); Mitsui & Co (33%); Nippon Steel (10.5%); Sumitomo Metal Industries (3.5%)
- Acquired: Rio Tinto: 2000

The Mesa J mine is an iron ore mine located in the Pilbara region of Western Australia, 16 kilometres south-west of Pannawonica.

The mine is owned by Robe River Iron Associates (53% Rio Tinto) and operated by Rio Tinto Iron Ore and is one of twelve iron ore mines the company operates in the Pilbara. In 2009, the combined Pilbara operations produced 202 million tonnes of iron ore, a 15 percent increase from 2008. The Pilbara operations accounted for almost 13 percent of the world's 2009 iron ore production of 1.59 billion tonnes.

The Hamersley Range, where the mine is located, contains 80 percent of all identified iron ore reserves in Australia and is one of the world's major iron ore provinces.

== Overview ==
Iron ore mines in the Pilbara region

Rio Tinto's iron ore operations in the Pilbara began in 1966. The mine itself began operations in 1994. The mine has an annual production capacity of 7 million tonnes of iron ore, sourced from open-pit operations. The ore is processed on site before being loaded onto rail. At the height of production, the mine produced 35 million tonnes of iron ore annually.

Ore from the mine is then transported to the coast through the Hamersley & Robe River railway line, where it is loaded onto ships. Ore from Mesa J, like from the West Angelas, is taken to Cape Lambert by rail to be exported as fines. The fines have a maximum size of 9.5 mm.

The mine's workforce is predominantly a Residential mine with workers taking residence in Pannawonica, and around 20% of the workforce on a fly-in fly-out roster.

The mine is located near the Mesa A mine. The new Mesa A mine is scheduled to replace the Mesa J mine which is nearing the end of its life span. The combined investment of Rio Tinto in the Mesa A and Brockman 4 mines was $2.4 billion.

== Robe River Iron Associates ==
Robe River Iron, owner of the mine, is jointly owned by:

- Rio Tinto - 53% - operator
- Mitsui & Co - 33%
- Nippon Steel - 10.5%
- Sumitomo Metal Industries - 3.5%

Robe River Iron operates the West Angelas, Mesa A and Mesa J mines. Rio Tinto acquired its share of 53% in late 2000, when it took over mining company North Limited.
