= West Angelas mine =

Iron ore mine in Western Australia

- Location in Western Australia
- Interactive map of West Angelas mine
- Location: Shire of East Pilbara, Pilbara, Western Australia, Australia; 23°10′23″S 118°45′53″E
- Products: Iron ore
- Production: 35.0 million tonnes/annum
- Opened: 2002
- Company: Rio Tinto Iron Ore (53%); Mitsui & Co (33%); Nippon Steel (10.5%); Sumitomo Metal Industries (3.5%)
- Website: http://www.riotintoironore.com/index.asp
- Acquired: Rio Tinto: 2000

Synthetic aperture radar satellite image of the West Angelas iron ore mine, 13 August 2023

The West Angelas mine is an iron ore mine located in the Pilbara region of Western Australia, 110 kilometres North West of Newman.

The mine is owned by Robe River Iron Associates (53% Rio Tinto) and operated by Rio Tinto Iron Ore and is one of twelve iron ore mines the company operates in the Pilbara. In 2009, the combined Pilbara operations produced 202 million tonnes of iron ore, a 15 percent increase from 2008. The Pilbara operations accounted for almost 13 percent of the world's 2009 iron ore production of 1.59 billion tonnes.

The Hamersley Range, where the mine is located, contains 80 percent of all identified iron ore reserves in Australia and is one of the world's major iron ore provinces.

== Overview ==
Iron ore mines in the Pilbara region

Rio Tinto's iron ore operations in the Pilbara began in 1966. The mine itself began operations in 2002. The mine has an annual production capacity of 29.5 million tonnes of iron ore, sourced from open-pit operations. The ore is processed on site before being loaded onto rail.

Ore from the mine is then transported to the coast on the Hamersley & Robe River railway line, where it is loaded onto ships. Ore from West Angelas, like from Mesa J, is taken to Cape Lambert by rail to be exported as fines. The fines have a maximum size of 9.5 mm.

The mine's workforce is on a fly-in fly-out roster. In 2009, the mine employed 989 people, an increase in comparison to 2008, when it only employed 867.

West Angelas is the site of Rio Tinto's "Mine of the future" project. The mine operates automated trucks, automated rockbreakers, automated drills and blasts, which are controlled from a Perth operations centre rather than local operators on site.

== Robe River Iron Associates ==
Robe River Iron, owner of the mine, is jointly owned by:

- Rio Tinto - 53% - operator
- Mitsui & Co - 33%
- Nippon Steel - 10.5%
- Sumitomo Metal Industries - 3.5%

Robe River Iron operates the West Angelas, Mesa A and Mesa J mines. Rio Tinto acquired its share of 53% in late 2000, when it took over mining company North Limited.

== See also ==
- West Angelas Airport
