= Mitsui Knowledge Industry =

Mitsui Knowledge Industry Co., Ltd.
- Native name: 三井情報株式会社
- Type: Public
- Industry: Information technology
- Founded: 1991; 35 years ago
- Headquarters: Tokyo, Japan
- Services: System integration Cloud computing Information security IT lifecycle support
- Revenue: JPY 53.2 billion
- Total assets: JPY 4.1 billion
- Number of employees: 1,823 (2016)
- Parent: Mitsui & Co.
- Website: Official Website

Mitsui Knowledge Industry Co., Ltd. (三井情報株式会社, Mitsui Jōhō Kabushiki-gaisha) is a Japanese company headquartered in Tokyo, Japan, that offers IT services.

== Overview ==
Originally, in 1991, 3Com Japan Corp. was established by Mitsui & Co. and 3Com Corp. . In 1994, 3Com Japan Corp. was renamed to Next Com Corp.. In 2007, Next Com Corp. acquired Mitsui Knowledge Development Corp., that was also established by Mitsui & Co. in 1967, then the company was renamed to Mitsui Knowledge Industry Co., Ltd. .

The company offers the services of system integration, cloud computing, information security, and IT lifecycle support in Japan and mostly for enterprises. The business type and scope is same as Itochu Techno-Solutions, SCSK and Uniadex, these are also the companies in Japan and mostly for enterprises.

The company was listed on the JASDAQ Securities Exchange (2665.TYO) in September 2000, then Tokyo Stock Exchange 2nd Section in April 2004. In January 2015, The company became the wholly owned subsidiary of Mitsui & Co. by takeover, and was delisted on Tokyo Stock Exchange.

== See also ==
- List of companies of Japan
