= ADF =

ADF may refer to:

== Aviation ==
- Aerospace Data Facilities of the US National Reconnaissance Office
- Aircraft deicing fluid
- Dexter B. Florence Memorial Field (FAA code), an airport in the US
- Adıyaman Airport in Adiyaman Province, Turkey (IATA airport code ADF)

== Organizations ==
- Aalto Design Factory, of Aalto University
- ADF Solutions, a US digital forensics company
- Alcohol and Drug Foundation, Australia
- Alliance Defending Freedom, a US conservative Christian organization
- Allied Democratic Forces, a Ugandan rebel group
- Ambazonia Defence Forces, a militant Cameroonian separatist group
- Antalya Diplomacy Forum, an annual conference held in Antalya, Turkey
- Arab Democracy Foundation, Qatar
- Arab Deterrent Force, serving in Lebanon
- Army Deployment Force, Singapore counter-terrorist unit
- Ár nDraíocht Féin, a Neopagan druid organization based in the US
- Australian Defence Force

== Science and technology ==
=== Computing ===
- Amiga Disk File format
- Amsterdam Density Functional, electronic structure program
- Automatic document feeder, in printers and scanners
- Oracle Application Development Framework

=== Other uses in science and technology ===
- ADF/Cofilin family, a family of actin-binding proteins
- African dwarf frogs, a group of aquatic amphibians belonging to the pipid frog genus Hymenochirus
- Alternate-day fasting, a variant of intermittent fasting
- Augmented Dickey–Fuller test, used in time series analysis

== Transportation ==
- Anyang East railway station, China Railway telegraph code ADF
- Automatic direction finder, a navigation instrument

== Other uses ==
- Alejandro Davidovich Fokina, a Spanish tennis player
- Alternative display facility, a type of financial exchange
- American Dance Festival, US
- Asian Dub Foundation, a British band
- Dhofari Arabic (ISO 639-3 code), Oman
