= Illumio =

American cybersecurity company

- Company type: Cloud computing security
- Industry: Data center and Cloud computing security
- Founded: 2013
- Founders: Andrew Rubin, P.J. Kirner
- Headquarters: Sunnyvale, California, United States
- Products: Illumio Segmentation, Illumio Insights
- Website: www.illumio.com

Illumio is an American cybersecurity company headquartered in Sunnyvale, California, specializing in breach containment. The company’s platform helps prevent lateral movement and strengthen cyber resilience across hybrid and multi-cloud environments.

== History ==
Illumio was founded in 2013 by Andrew Rubin and P.J. Kirner. The company's initial funding rounds attracted notable investors, including Andreessen Horowitz, General Catalyst, and Formation 8. In April 2015, Illumio raised $100 million in a Series C funding round led by BlackRock and Accel Partners, bringing total funding to over $142 million at that time.

In June 2017, the company secured a $125 million Series D funding round led by clients advised by J.P. Morgan Asset Management, the funding supported product development and international expansion.

By June 2021, Illumio had raised a $225 million Series F funding round led by Thoma Bravo, achieving a valuation of $2.75 billion. This funding was intended to expand investments in customer success, product innovation, and global partner strategies.

== Customers ==
Illumio’s customers span sectors such as finance, technology, and hospitality.

== Funding ==
As of June 2021, Illumio has raised a total of $558.2 million across multiple funding rounds:

- Series B (2013): $34.5 million
- Series C (2015): $100 million
- Series D (2017): $125 million
- Series E (2019): $65.2 million
- Series F (2021): $225 million

== See also ==
- List of cybersecurity companies
- Zero Trust security model
- Microsegmentation
