= Librex Computer Systems =

American computer manufacturer

Librex Computer Systems Inc.
- Type: Subsidiary
- Industry: Computer
- Founded: June 1990; 36 years ago in San Jose, California
- Defunct: April 1993; 33 years ago
- Key people: Toshiji Tanaka, president and CFO
- Products: Notebooks
- Parent: Nippon Steel Corporation

Librex Computer Systems Inc. was a short-lived American subsidiary of the Nippon Steel Corporation that manufactured notebook computers from 1990 to 1992. Librex had roots in Nippon Steel's Electronics and Information Systems Division (EISD) back in Japan, which starting in 1986 had formed joint ventures with several high-profile American computer companies. Librex was Nippon Steel EISD's first venture in the United States; it also set up Nippon Steel Computer PLC in the United Kingdom to sell identical products. The company's notebooks received praise in the technology press, but a fierce price war in the market for laptops in the early 1990s combined with dwindling profit margins compelled Nippon Steel to dissolve Librex in 1993.

== History ==
=== Background and foundation (1986–1990) ===
Librex Computer Systems was incorporated in San Jose, California, in June 1990; Nippon Steel formally introduced it in August 1990. Librex was the first venture in the United States for Nippon Steel's Electronics and Information Systems Division (EISD), which had sold software and hardware only in Japan. Librex was forerun by the existence of NS Computer Systems, Inc., a company set up by Nippon Steel in Santa Ana, California, to research the American computer marketplace.

The incorporation of Librex came at a time when Nippon Steel, at the time the largest steelmaking company in the world in terms of sales, was increasingly diversifying its operations. Although computer companies investing in Japanese steel companies and vice versa was somewhat commonplace in the turn of the 1990s technology industry—EISD had ties to several American computer companies—Nippon Steel set out Librex to operate independently, which was described as a rarity. Said Susan MacKnight of the Washington-based Japan Economic Institute, no other steel company had "set up a wholly owned subsidiary [in] anything outside the steel business in this country" up to that point. Along with Librex in the United States, Nippon Steel set up Nippon Steel Computer PLC in Langley, Berkshire.

Nippon Steel EISD, which only operated domestically, influenced the foundation of Librex, as executives within Nippon Steel expressed the desire for the company to have its own name-brand commodity computer. Starting in 1986, EISD had formed joint ventures with the American companies IBM, Concurrent Computer Corporation, Supertek Computers, Sun Microsystems, CalComp, and 3M and Japan companies Hitachi and Itochu to help develop EISD's hardware and software products. Discussions within Nippon Steel to form an international computer company began in 1987 with the commissioning of EISD to research the manufacture of workstations and laptops. A slate of notebook computers were developed by EISD in partnership with the EISS laboratories of Tokyo and Kanagawa, Japan. On Librex's incorporation in June 1990, the general manager of EISD, Toshiji Tanaka, was named president and CFO of Librex and moved to San Jose. The subsidiary employed only 12 in August 1990, with 28 additional positions planned for creation by December; Librex projected 80 jobs in late 1991. Goodby, Silverstein & Partners, an advertising agency in San Francisco, handled Librex's print ads.

=== First products (1990–1991) ===
Librex contracted the mass manufacturing of the company's initial product lineup, a duo of notebook computers, to an unnamed American firm. The Librex office in San Jose mostly handled sales and marketing and other operational duties, although the office did possess limited manufacturing facilities. The Librex 386SX and Librex 286—two notebook computers based on Intel's 80386SX and 80286 processors respectively—were unveiled at COMDEX/Fall in November 1990. The former was released on time in December 1990; the Librex 386SX was released in limited quantities that month, shipping en masse in March 1991. The Librex 386SX was mostly positively received in InfoWorld, ABA Journal, and PC Magazine. The Baltimore Sun praised Librex for its unusually generous warranty policy for the price point of the Librex 386SX, which offered free replacement of defective notebooks within 24 hours for the first 100 days of ownership.

=== Subsequent lineups and dissolution (1991–1993) ===
In November 1991, Librex unveiled the M486 and M386SL lines of notebooks. They were based on Intel's 486 and 386SL processors respectively and were compatible with an optional docking station. Interfacing to the laptop through a 130-pin connector, the docking station added two 16-bit ISA expansion slots, a SCSI hard drive adapter, a passthrough for serial, parallel, and external monitor cables, and three 3.5-inch disk drive bays. Slated for an early 1992 release, they were shortly followed up by the introduction of the Librex T386SX, featuring a modular design that extended into the design of the caddy for the internal hard drive, which could be removed toollessly for replacement or stored away as a security precaution. It took proprietary RAM modules for memory upgrades, supporting up to 12 MB of RAM from the stock 4 MB. The T386SX's floppy drive was external only, connected to the notebook via a detachable cable. The T386SX's case bore a rubberized coating to make it scratch-resistant and slip-proof. It was the first and only Librex laptop to feature PC Card slots. Like the Librex 386SX, it received mostly good reviews.

Although Librex's laptops continued to receive high marks for their build quality, the company saw pressure in the crowded notebook market by the beginning of 1992. Amid falling profit margins, Nippon Steel announced in August 1992 that they would dissolve both Librex in the U.S. and Nippon Steel Computer PLC in the United Kingdom, in what was called "the first visible fallout from the price war" hitting the portable computer market in the early 1990s, according to IDC. Librex pulled their products from the market that month but continued to support customers until March 1993 while they discussed selling their capital and intellectual property to potential buyers. Librex partially reversed its stance, releasing the R386SL notebook—its last product—in late 1992 and slightly postponing its dissolution date to April 1993. Polywell Computers of San Francisco ultimately bought the tooling for Librex's notebook computers, selling Librex-based Polywell notebooks in the United States in 1993.

In its three years of existence, Librex managed to attain the rank of the 47th largest personal computer maker in the United States by August 1992. Dan Crane, vice president of sales and marketing for Librex, reflected in 1996 that Nippon Steel's remote management imposed handicaps in selling Librex's products at attractive prices: "Nippon Steel simply didn't have the cultural infrastructure needed to compete here ... [having a] rather cool, ultraslim notebook for 1992 with quantities and prices that were [arbitrarily] set in 1991", in part due to management honoring the initial quotes it gave to retail and direct sales partners, refusing to ask for adjustments after the fact.

Librex's San Jose headquarters at 1140 Ringwood Court later became home to Synaptics.
