= Fuji Iron & Steel =

Japanese steel company, 1950 to 1970

Coordinates: 35°21′17.8″N 139°52′28.2″E

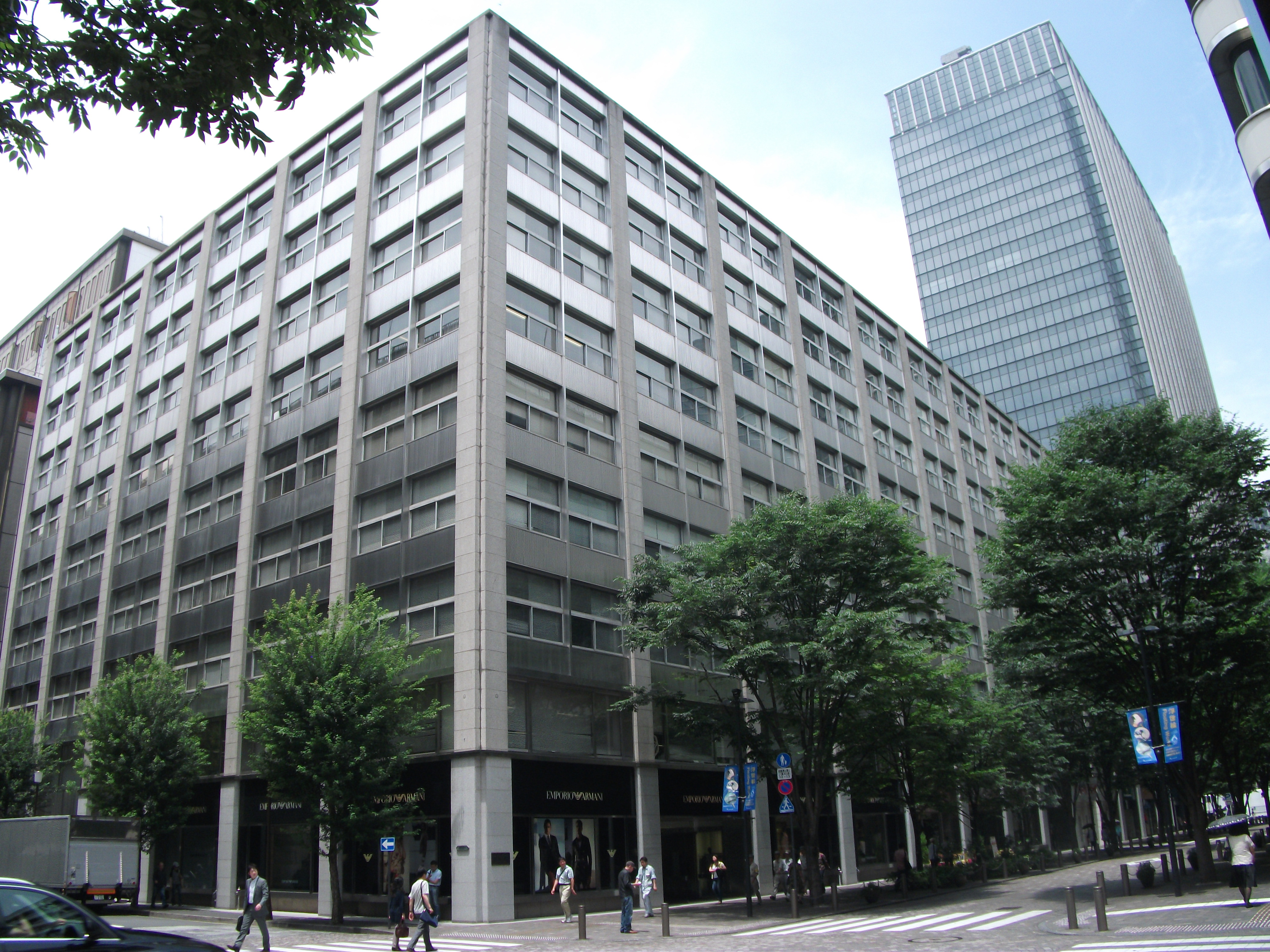
The Fuji Building, former headquarters of Fuji Iron & Steel, torn down in 2015.

Fuji Iron & Steel (Japanese: 富士製鐵) was a major Japanese steel-producing company that existed from 1950 to 1970.

== History ==
Fuji Iron & Steel was created in 1950, under the antitrust, anti-zaibatsu edict of the Allied Occupying Forces, as the old semi-government-owned Japan Iron & Steel (日本製鐵) was split into four entities, one of which being Yawata Steel Company (八幡製鐵株式會社). With its headquarters at Fuji Building (富士ビルヂング) in Marunouchi, Chiyoda-ku, Tokyo, Fuji had the following main steel plants:

- Kamaishi Steel Works (釜石製鐵所), Kamaishi, Iwate
- Nagoya Works (名古屋製鐵所, of former Nippon Steel), Tokai, Aichi - Bought in 1967 from Tokai Steel (東海製鐵), which had been established in 1958 to satisfy demand from Toyota, etc. near Nagoya
- Hirohata Works (広畑製鐵所), Himeji, Hyogo
- Oita Steel Works (大分製鐵所), Ōita, Ōita - This plant was being built, waiting for its first mill (a hot rolling mill) in operation in 1971.

It also had a sizable amount of chemical and construction business. Its central research facility was located in Sagamihara, Kanagawa (where now is the Aoyama Gakuin University's Sagamihara Campus).

As the antitrust sentiments waned, Fuji merged itself in 1970 with Yawata Steel to form the new Nippon Steel Corporation (新日本製鐵). In 2012, the merger of Nippon Steel and Sumitomo Metal Industries created Nippon Steel & Sumitomo Metal Corporation.

== See also ==
- Japan's Steel Works
- Zaibatsu
