= Sumitomo Precision Products =

Sumitomo Precision Products Co., Ltd. 住友精密工業株式会社
- Company type: Public K.K.
- Traded as: TYO: 6355
- Founded: January 1961
- Headquarters: Amagasaki, Hyogo, Japan
- Area served: Global
- Number of employees: 1,779 (Consolidated, as of March, 2021)
- Website: Sumitomo Precision Products

Sumitomo Precision Products Co., Ltd. is an integrated manufacturer of aerospace equipment, heat exchangers, hydraulic controls, wireless sensor networks, sensors, micro-electronics technology, and environmental systems. The aerospace division supplies its products to aerospace industries worldwide, including Boeing, Airbus, Bombardier, and Embraer.

== History ==
Formerly a division of Sumitomo Metal Industries, the aerospace business was spun off as Sumitomo Precision Products in 1961.

== Products & Services ==
- Landing gear
- Aircraft propellers
- Jet-engine coolers
- Heat exchangers (for LNG, etc.)
- Hydraulic actuators
- Microelectromechanical systems and semiconductor production equipment
- Wireless Sensor Networks
- Foundry
- MEMS sensors
- Ozonizers
