= West Angelas Airport =

Airport in Western Australia

- IATA: WLP; ICAO: YANG

Summary
- Airport type: Private
- Owner: Rio Tinto
- Operator: Aerodrome Management Services
- Serves: West Angelas mine
- Location: Pilbara, Western Australia
- Elevation AMSL: 2,340 ft (710 m)
- Coordinates: 23°08′08″S 118°42′26″E

Map
- Location of the airport in Western Australia

Runways
Direction	Length		Surface
Direction	m	ft	Surface
04/22	1,800	5,906	Asphalt

West Angelas Airport (IATA: WLP, ICAO: YANG) is an airport in the Pilbara region of Western Australia. It supports Rio Tinto's West Angelas mine.

== Airlines and destinations ==
=== Passenger ===
Airlines	Destinations
Virgin Australia Regional Airlines	Perth
