= Infysec =

American cybersecurity company

infySEC
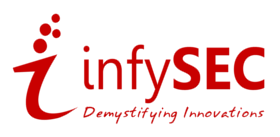
- Industry: CyberSecurity
- Founded: 2010; 16 years ago
- Founder: https://www.vinodsenthil.com/
- Headquarters: Chennai, India
- Area served: Worldwide
- Key people: Founder & Director: Vinod Senthil T
- Website: www.infysec.com

infySEC is a company that provides cybersecurity services to medium-sized enterprises and governments across the world located in Chennai, India. It focuses on security technology services, security consulting, security training, and research and development.

== History ==
The company was founded in 2010 by T. Vinod Senthil, an ethical hacker, along with Adhavan Rajadurai. They gathered a team of security professionals and started the company with the objective of providing cybersecurity services and training. Within two years of inception, they had Karthick Vigneshwar, a Risk & Forensics Expert, join them for technical support.

In November 2009, Senthil was the first person in Chennai to demonstrate wardriving, and he assisted the cyber crime department and NDTV Hindu NEWS.

In July 2013, the company conducted an event dubbed "E-HACK", a 24-hour hackathon.

The company presented at ASSOCHAM for two consecutive years on cybersecurity.

In 2016, the company was awarded as a notable startup by That Startup Story.

The company has completed over 200 security projects for various countries including Australia, the Maldives, and Dubai, as well as various governments, and has conducted 1000+ workshops to raise awareness of the issue of cybersecurity.

== Products ==
Its products include Capture The Flag, for cybersecurity enthusiasts to test their skills in the field of cybersecurity; an ad-free Android app called CyberSec Tabloid for cybersecurity news updates; and a free Android app called AndroSentry that helps to monitor Android devices and includes a theft tracker, a call blocker, a virus scanner, and an app locker.
