= Penta Security =

South Korean cybersecurity company

Penta Security Inc.
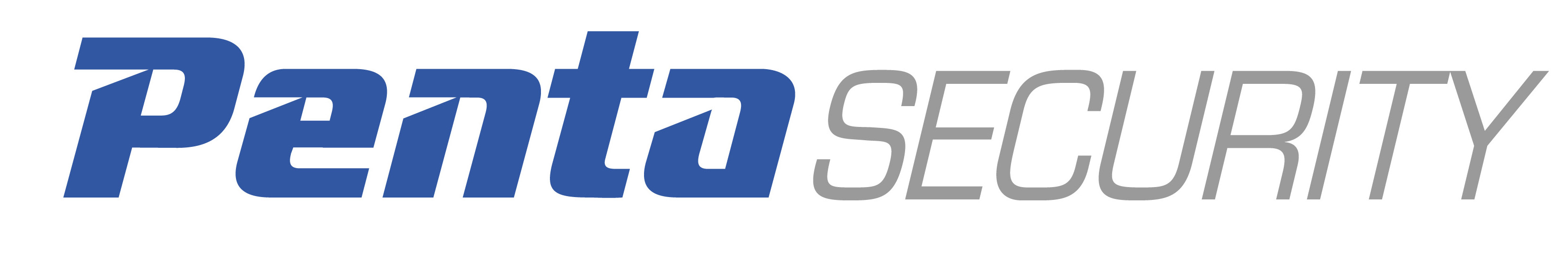
- Type: Private
- Industry: IT security
- Founded: July 21, 1997; 28 years ago in Seoul, South Korea
- Founder: Seokwoo Lee
- Headquarters: Yeoido, Seoul, South Korea
- Area served: Worldwide
- Key people: Taegyun Kim (CEO)
- Products: Web application firewall, Database encryption, PKI solution, Cloud Security
- Brands: D.AMO, WAPPLES, Cloudbric
- Number of employees: 201-500 (2024).
- Website: pentasecurity.com

Penta Security Inc. (Korean: 펜타시큐리티) is a South Korean global cybersecurity company that provides database encryption products, web application firewall(WAF) SaaS, WAF appliance, and cloud security products. Its headquarters is located in Seoul, South Korea, and it is considered as one of the country’s first-generation security firms.

== History ==
Penta Security was founded on July 21, 1997, by Seokwoo Lee. In 2004, the company launched D.AMO (previous name: D’Amo), the first database encryption product to be commercialized in South Korea. The following year, in April 2005, it released web application firewall appliance product WAPPLES. Penta Security established a local subsidiary, Penta Security Systems K.K., in Japan in January 2009. In October 2014, the company introduced the pilot service of its cloud-based web application firewall, Cloudbric.

In 2022, Taegyun Kim, the formal Vice President, was appointed as CEO (Chief Executive Officer). Penta Security established Penta Security VIVA Co., Ltd. in Vietnam in August 2023.

In October 2024, the company opened a branch office in Abu Dhabi, United Arab Emirates.

== Products and Services ==
=== Data Security: Data Encryption ===
D.AMO was the first South Korean DB encryption service provided in South Korea. Its previous name was D'amo, but changed its name in to D.AMO in 2024.

=== Web Security: Web Application Firewall ===
WAPPLES is WAF provided by Penta Security on an appliance (hardware) format. It includes API, SSL, and L7 security defenses. WAPPLES utilizes its own logic-based detection AI COCEP™ engine.

=== Cloud Security: SaaS ===
Cloudbric is a brand for SECaaS in cloud security. The core products are Cloudbric WAF+ and Cloudbric Managed Rules for AWS, which are cloud-based web application firewalls. Unlike other products by Penta Security, where they focus mainly on B2B services, Cloudbric also provide a VPN as a B2C service. Cloudbric WAF+ is based on WAPPLES where it uses a logic-based detection engine and a deep learning artificial intelligence engine.
