= Critical Start =

Cybersecurity company

- Type: Private
- Industry: Cybersecurity
- Founded: 2012
- Founder: Rob Davis
- Headquarters: Plano, Texas, United States
- Key people: Scott White (CEO); Randy Watkins (CTO); Kimberly Graham (CPO); John Schilsky (CFO)
- Website: www.criticalstart.com

Critical Start is a cybersecurity company based in Plano, Texas, with offices across the United States. The company provides managed detection and response (MDR), threat intelligence, endpoint security, penetration testing, risk assessments, and incident response services.

Scott White was appointed CEO in September 2024.

== History ==
Critical Start was founded in 2012 by Rob Davis, a former RSA Security executive. The company’s creation was motivated in part by high-profile nation-state attacks on cybersecurity firms in 2011, including the noted (RSA) SecurID breach.

In March 2018, Critical Start announced an agreement to acquire the security analytics platform, Advanced Threat Analytics, to incorporate its "Zero-Trust" Analytics Platform. As a part of the agreement, Critical Start launched its native iOS and Android mobile security operations center (SOC) application.

Later the next year, Critical Start published its second annual research survey in August 2019. The survey reported that security operations center analysts face, a "surprising number of alerts each day that are taking longer to investigate". Based on survey data, Critical Start revealed later that month that they would be expanding to a channel-driven model along with the expansion of the company's national distributors and network of value-added resellers.

In November 2021, Critical Start announced plans to spin off CyberOne, a value-added reseller (VAR) generating annual revenue of more than $100 million that had operated autonomously under the Critical Start brand since 2012. As an independent company, CyberOne will deliver security consulting and professional services, including Red Team & Incident Response offerings from its specialized TeamARES group.

In June 2023, Critical Start opened two new facilities: one in Lehi, Utah, and another in Pune, India.

Founder and CEO Rob Davis retired in September 2024 and Scott White was named his successor. Davis continues to serve as Executive Chairman.

== Funding ==
In June 2019, Bregal Sagemount, a growth equity firm, invested $40 million in Critical Start as part of the company's first outside investment. According to the Dallas Morning News, the "investment helped accelerate its North American expansion" and partnerships with Microsoft, Splunk, Palo Alto Networks, Cylance, and Carbon Black.

DC Advisory served as the financial advisor to Critical Start. Financial terms of the deal were not disclosed.
