= SCSK =

Japanese IT service company

SCSK Corporation
- Native name: 株式会社SCSK
- Romanized name: Kabushiki-gaisha Esu-Shī-Esu-Kei
- Formerly: Sumitomo Computer Service Corporation (1969–2005); Sumitomo Computer System Corporation (2005–2011)
- Type: Subsidiary
- Traded as: TYO: 9719 (1989-2026)
- Industry: System integration; Information security; Computer software
- Predecessor: CSK Corporation
- Founded: 1968; 58 years ago
- Founder: Isao Okawa
- Headquarters: Toyosu, Kōtō, Tokyo, Japan
- Revenue: ¥323.9 billion
- Total assets: ¥21.1 billion
- Number of employees: 11,910 (2017)
- Parent: Sumitomo Corporation
- Subsidiaries: CRI Middleware
- Website: www.scsk.jp

SCSK Corporation (株式会社SCSK, Kabushiki-gaisha Esu-Shī-Esu-Kei) is a Japanese information technology company headquartered in Tokyo, Japan, offering IT services and computer software.

== History ==
In 1969, Sumitomo Computer Service Corporation was established by Sumitomo Corporation. In 2005, Sumitomo Computer Service Corporation and Sumitomo Electronics Corporation were merged into Sumitomo Computer System Corporation.

Separately, in 1968, CSK Corporation was established by Japanese entrepreneur Isao Okawa in 1968. The acronym CSK was derived from "Computer Service". CSK established CSK Research Institute, later renamed as CRI Middleware, in 1983. At its peak, the company, the largest independent software company in Japan until it being acquired, was called the CSK Group. In the 2000s, its real estate investment business failed, resulting in heavy losses to the company after Okawa's death in 2001.

Outside of Japan, CSK was widely known for its takeover of Sega in 1984, ended in the sale of the company to Sammy in 2004, through which Sega Sammy Holdings was established.

In April 2011, Sumitomo Corporation acquired CSK through a takeover. In October 2011, Sumitomo Computer System Corporation and CSK Corporation went through a statutory merger, in which Sumitomo Computer System absorbed CSK Corporation and was re-branded SCSK Corporation.

At the 2025 Japan Mobility Show, SCSK unveiled a new electric concept car that leans heavily on emerging artificial intelligence technology to create a personalized experience for each driver. The company claims the car to a software-defined vehicle, wherein the emphasis upon customization is within updatable software as compared to rigid hardware.

SCSK was delisted from the Tokyo Stock Exchange in February 2026.

== Services ==
The company offers the services of system integration, cloud computing, information security and produces computer software in Japan, mostly on a B2B basis for enterprises. SCSK Corporation's business type and scope is similar to those of Itochu Techno-Solutions, Uniadex and Mitsui Knowledge Industry, which also specialize in IT services. The company has been listed on the Tokyo Stock Exchange since 1989, then as Sumitomo Computer Service Corporation.

== See also ==
- List of companies of Japan
