= Raz-Lee =

Raz-Lee Security
- Type: Private
- Industry: Computer Software
- Founded: Israel (1983; 43 years ago)
- Headquarters: Nanuet, New York, United States, Germany, Italy, Israel
- Area served: Worldwide
- Key people: Shmuel Zailer, C.E.O.
- Products: Complete Cyber, Security & Auditing Products for IBM i Servers
- Website: www.razlee.com

Raz-Lee Security, Inc. is an international organization that provides data security solutions for IBM's Power i servers.

The company's clients include Fiat, Agfa, Teva Pharmaceuticals, Avnet, AIG, Dun & Bradstreet and the Israel branch of American insurance company American International Group, among others.

== History ==
Founded in 1983, the company was formerly headquartered in Herzliya, Israel. By 1992, 33% of the company's products were being sold in the United States, and from 1994 to 1996 its business there, where it had offices in Nanuet, New York, dramatically increased, though its primary purchasers were still spread through Europe, the Middle East and Africa. As of 2009, the company is headquartered in Nanuet, with a research and development facility in Israel. The company also has offices in Israel and Italy and maintains a Technical Support and US Account Management center in San Francisco.

In 2014, Raz-Lee expanded its international sales network by partnering with UK-based IBM i services provider Proximity to serve the UK and Ireland.

The same year, the company appointed Manuel Alonso as director of sales for Latin America.

== Products ==
Raz-Lee develops a range of security and data-access products for the IBM i platform. In 2012, the company introduced DB-Gate, a database connectivity solution that allows IBM i applications to access external databases directly using native IBM i SQL commands, without the need for middleware or proprietary interfaces.

Raz-Lee develops Raz-Lee MFA, a native multi-factor authentication solution for IBM i that strengthens access control by requiring additional authentication factors - such as one-time passwords, authenticator applications, or push notifications - when users connect to IBM i services. The product supports flexible authentication policies based on the user, the accessed service, and network location.

Raz-Lee also develops iSecurity Firewall, an IBM i-native network security product that incorporates zero-trust concepts through micro-segmentation. This approach enables administrators to define granular rules controlling access to IBM i resources based on factors such as user identity, IP address, network location, and port, while maintaining minimal impact on system performance.

In 2018, Raz-Lee expanded its security portfolio with iSecurity Anti-Ransomware, a product designed to detect and mitigate ransomware attacks affecting the IBM i Integrated File System. The solution monitors anomalous file behavior to identify potential attacks, isolates threats in real time, and can issue automated responses or alerts to security personnel and monitoring systems.

AP-Journal is a fraud-detection and auditing tool for IBM i environments that uses system journaling to monitor sensitive DB2/400 data, application files, and system objects for unauthorised or anomalous changes. It allows administrators to define thresholds for acceptable data modifications, integrates with SIEM platforms for high-volume real-time alerting, and supports advanced filtering and developer-defined exit routines to identify potential fraudulent activity.
