= Uniadex =

Japanese information technology company

Uniadex Ltd.
- Native name: ユニアデックス 株式会社
- Type: Private KK
- Industry: Information technology
- Founded: 1997; 29 years ago
- Headquarters: Tokyo, Japan
- Key people: Ken Tanaka
- Services: System integration Cloud computing Information security IT lifecycle support
- Revenue: JPY 125.5 billion
- Total assets: JPY 750 million
- Number of employees: 2,812 (2016)
- Parent: BIPROGY
- Subsidiaries: Netmarks
- Website: Official Website

Uniadex Ltd. (ユニアデックス株式会社, Yuniadekkusu Kabushiki-gaisha) is a Japanese company headquartered in Tokyo, Japan, that offers IT services.

== Overview ==
Originally, in 1997, Uniadex Ltd. was established by Nihon Unisys Ltd. (Unisys of Japan). The company offers system integration, cloud computing, information security, and IT lifecycle support services in Japan and mostly for enterprises, apart from Nihon Unisys. The company is an official partner of Blue Coat Systems, Cisco Systems, Citrix Systems, Dell EMC, etc. The business type and scope is the same as Itochu Techno-Solutions and SCSK.

Uniadex was established when Nihon Unisys Ltd. acquired Netmarks Inc. from Sumitomo Electric Industries Ltd. by takeover in 2007, and when Uniadex Ltd. and Netmarks Inc. merged in 2014.
