= ADF Solutions =

American digital forensics company

- Industry: Digital forensics
- Founded: 2005
- Founder: J.J. Wallia; Raphael Bousquet
- Headquarters: Reston, Virginia
- Website: adfsolutions.com

Advanced Digital Forensic Solutions, Inc. (ADF Solutions) is a company based in Reston, Virginia, that develops tools for scanning suspect computers and digital devices to locate and extract data, a process known as digital forensics. Digital forensic tools scan mobile phones, computers and digital devices to collect intelligence or evidence of a crime to identify computers that contain content relevant to an investigation.

Triage-G2 is a media exploitation (MEDEX) tool used on computers and peripheral devices. It is typically deployed on a USB device by military personnel working in the field. The USB devices, known as triage keys, can be prepared in advance or in the field by selecting specific search criteria. The users of this tool do not require significant technical computer skills. Triage-G2 is currently in use by several U.S. Defense and Intelligence agencies.

Digital Evidence Investigator is a forensic triage tool used on computers by forensic examiners in lab environments, or on location, to scan suspect devices and prioritize them for full examinations. Digital Evidence Investigator is in use by law enforcement agencies worldwide.

== History ==
ADF Solutions was founded in 2005 by J.J. Wallia and Raphael Bousquet with $100,000 from the Maryland Department of Business and Economic Development Challenge Program and a $75,000 loan from Maryland Technology Development Corp., as well as undisclosed private funding.

== Document and media exploitation ==
Document and media exploitation (DOMEX) is defined as the extraction, translation, and analysis of physical and digital documents and media to generate useful and timely information.
