= Nippon Steel =

Japanese steelmaker

Nippon Steel Corporation
- Logo used since 2019

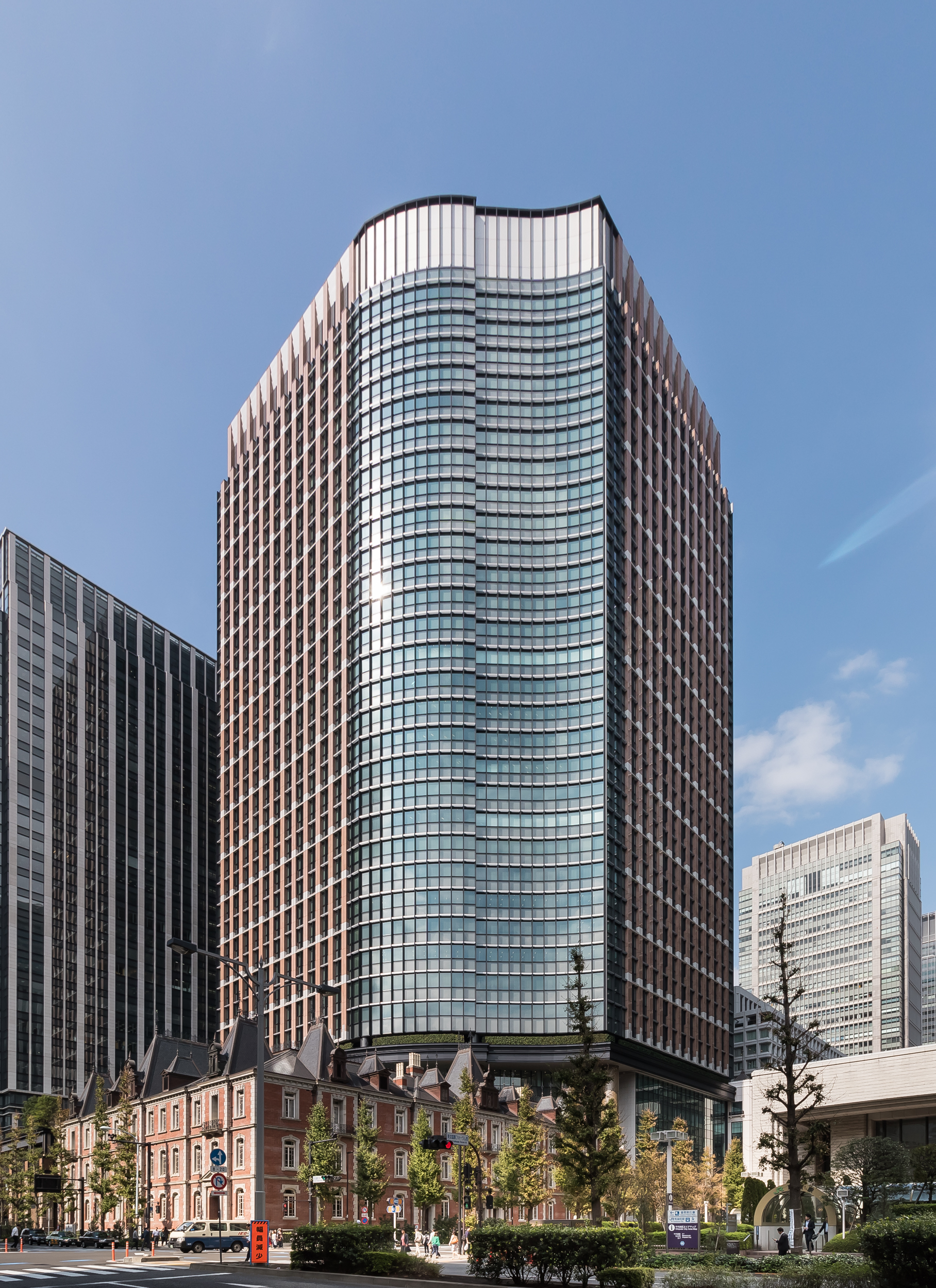
- Headquarters in Chiyoda, Tokyo
- Native name: 日本製鉄株式会社
- Romanized name: Nippon Seitetsu kabushiki gaisha
- Formerly: Nippon Steel Corporation (1970–2012); Nippon Steel & Sumitomo Metal Corporation (2012–2019)
- Type: Public
- Traded as: TYO: 5401; NAG: 5401; FSE: 5401; SSE: 5401; TOPIX Large70 component
- Industry: Steel
- Predecessors: Japan Iron & Steel; Yawata Iron & Steel Co.; Fuji Iron & Steel; Sumitomo Metal Industries
- Founded: March 31, 1970; 56 years ago (as New Japan Steel) October 1, 2012; 14 years ago (as Nippon Steel & Sumitomo Metal)
- Founders: Yoshihiro Inayama; Shigeo Nagano
- Headquarters: Marunouchi, Chiyoda, Tokyo, Japan
- Key people: Eiji Hashimoto (chairman & CEO)
- Revenue: ▼¥8.87 trillion (US$80.79 billion) (FY2026)
- Operating income: ▼¥682.4 billion (US$6.22 billion) (FY2026)
- Net income: ▼¥442.8 billion (US$4.03 billion) (FY2026)
- Total assets: ▲¥11.24 trillion (US$102.42 billion) (FY2026)
- Total equity: ▲¥5.28 trillion (US$48.11 billion) (FY2026)
- Number of employees: 116,000 (2026)
- Subsidiaries: Nippon Steel Engineering; Nippon Steel Materials; Nippon Steel Chemical; NS Solutions; Osaka Steel; U.S. Steel
- Website: www.nipponsteel.com

Nippon Steel Corporation (Japanese: 日本製鉄株式会社, Hepburn: Nippon Seitetsu kabushiki gaisha; also known as Nippon Steel and previously known as Nippon Steel & Sumitomo Metal until 2019) is a Japanese steel manufacturing company, headquartered in Marunouchi, Chiyoda, Tokyo. The company has four business segments, which are steelmaking, engineering, chemicals, and systems solutions. It is the largest producer of crude steel in Japan and the fourth largest in the world.

The company is on the Forbes Global 2000 list, ranked 1971 in 2023. The company is the third incarnation of the Nippon Steel name, each time with a slightly different spelling or pronunciation. The original company, known as Japan Iron & Steel Co., Ltd. (Note: Japanese: 日本製鐵株式会社, Hepburn: Nihon Seitetsu Kabushiki-gaisha), was split into two separate companies in 1950. These two companies later merged in 1970 to form Nippon Steel Corporation (Note: Japanese: 新日本製鐵株式会社, Hepburn: Shin Nihon Seitetsu kabushiki gaisha; NSC) and this name lasted until 2012, when it merged with Sumitomo Metal Industries and rebranded to its post-merger name. The company's English name reverted to its 1970 name in 2019, while its Japanese name returned to the original 1934 name.

== History ==
=== Early years ===
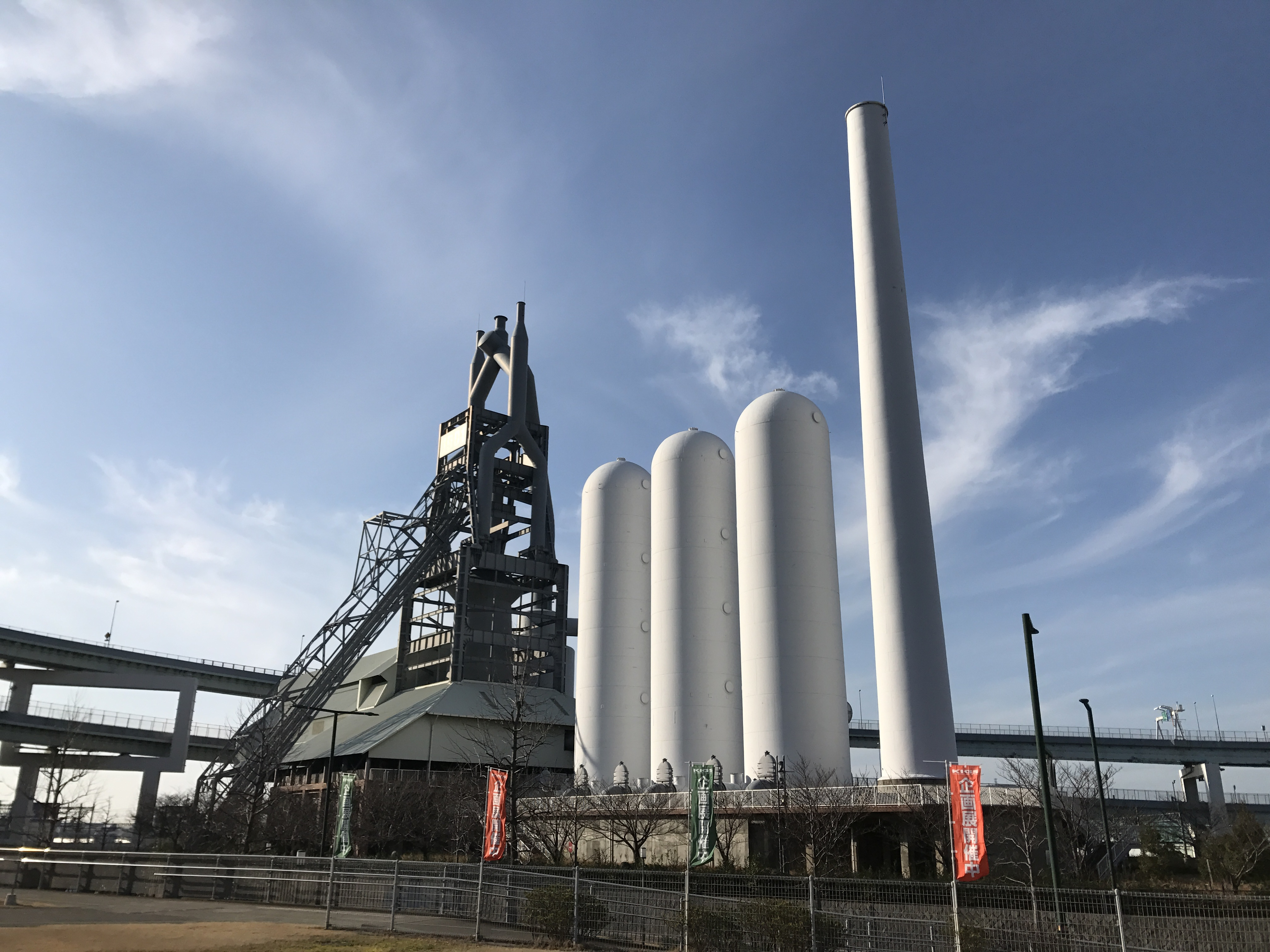
Higashida 1st Blast Furnace, Yahatahigashi, Kitakyūshū, operated between 1901 and 1972

Nippon Steel traces its roots to Japan Iron & Steel Co., Ltd., established in 1934 through the merger of the Yahata Steel Works and several other steel producers with blast furnaces. In 1950, the company's steel production business was split into two companies: Yawata Iron & Steel (八幡製鉄, Yahata Seitetsu), (Note: The correct pronunciation of the Japanese name is 'Yahata'. The company's official use of 'Yawata' in English originates from an erroneous reading of the Chinese characters that constitute its name by non-Japanese.) and Fuji Iron & Steel (富士製鉄, Fuji Seitetsu).

These two companies merged again in 1970 to form Nippon Steel Corporation (新日本製鐵, Shin Nippon Seitetsu). Beginning in early 1981, however, the company cut production and saw a sharp decline in profit that fiscal year. Forced to close furnaces, the company exhibited a typical Japanese economic aversion to layoffs, opting instead to offer standard early retirement enticements but also less conventional schemes such as a mushroom cultivation venture that used the surplus heat created by steel furnaces to temperature control a fecund fungi complex.

=== Troubled times ===
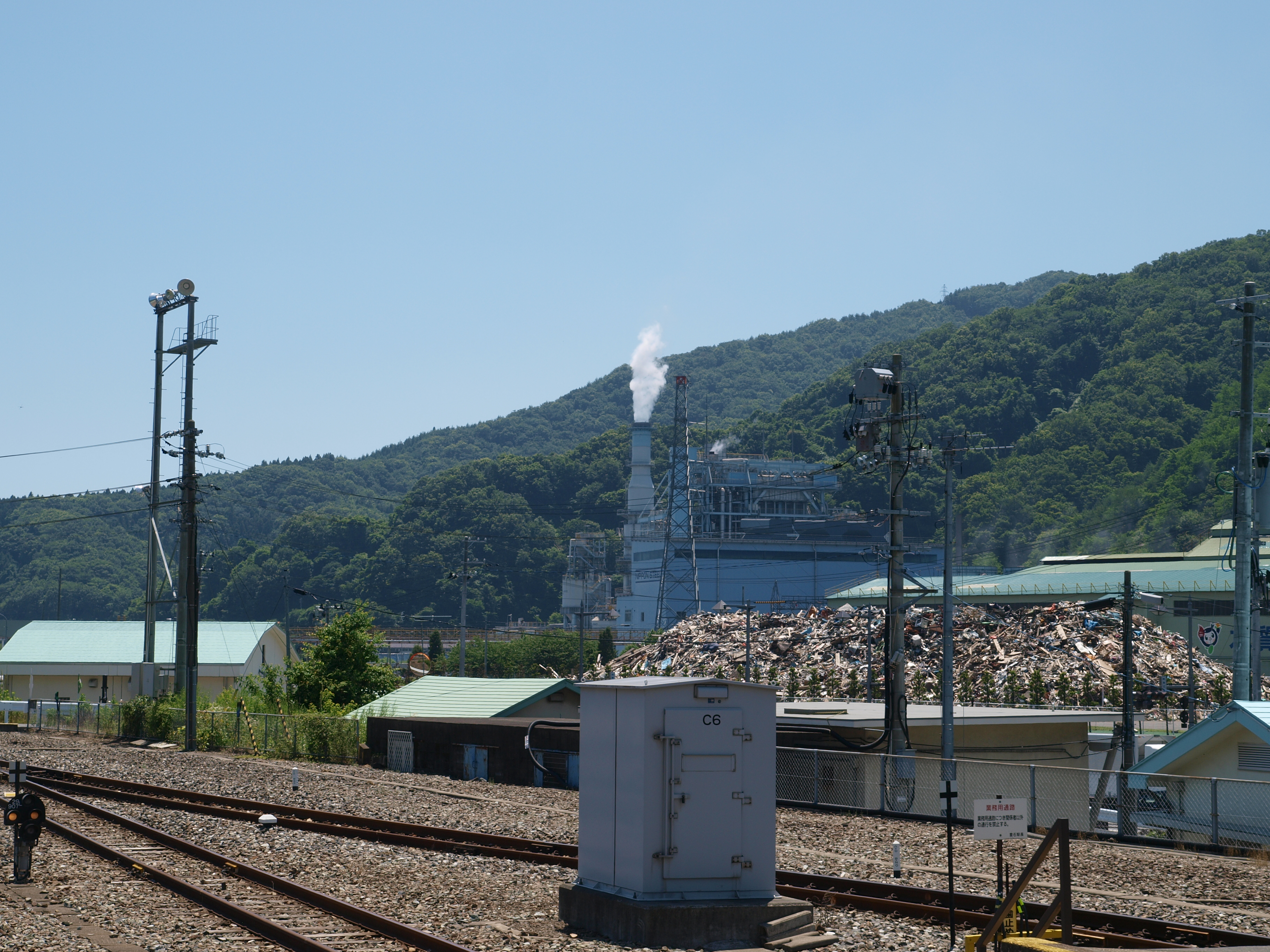
The blast furnaces at the Kamaishi Works were closed in 1989 after 109 years of operation, along with furnaces at other domestic locations.

Attributing the drop to higher material costs, the company entered into another troubled year. In 1983, the company reported the end of the fiscal year (March 31) would reveal Nippon Steel was in an even more beleaguered situation. A fall in demand brought about a 39 percent tumble in profits from an already weak previous year.

During this time, the entire Japanese steel industry struggled in a period of turmoil as other nations such as South Korea, with only a fraction of labor costs, won over business. The company announced a loss in 1986, prompting a determined effort to diversify away from the moribund "smokestack" industrial sector and to provide new work for thousands of employees that would be transferred from closing furnaces. During the 1980s and 1990s, Nippon Steel permanently closed blast furnaces at three of its eight primary domestic locations: Kamaishi (1989), Sakai (1990), and Hirohata (1993).

=== Diversification ===
Nippon Steel expanded or further established itself in semiconductors, electronics, a theme park called Space World, software, and even human resources products. Most notable was Librex Computer Systems, Nippon Steel's attempt to sell notebook computers abroad that lasted from 1990 to 1993. The company bucked seven struggling but profitable years when it returned to loss in 1993. Again, thousands of employees would be transferred to new operations. Due to cost-cutting, the company returned to health in 1995. However, Nippon Steel reported earnings in 1999 suffered from an overwhelming charge needed to cover pension costs, a problem not uncommon for shrinking industrial giants. 2002 and 2003 would be back-to-back loss years, but robust demand for steel in the People's Republic of China returned the company to profitability. (However, Nippon Steel had an operating profit for 2002 and 2003. The losses were made of extraordinary losses because of reevaluation of real estate and securities of the company among others.) Following a triple merger of Sumitomo Corporation, Kinzoku Steel Corporation (Sumikin Bussan), and the existing Nippon Steel, NSSC was formed as these companies' conglomerate Stainless Steel division.

=== Merger ===
In early 2011, Nippon Steel announced plans to merge with Sumitomo Metal Industries. With Nippon Steel producing ~26.5 million tonnes of steel per year and Sumitomo making ~11 million tonnes, the merged entity would produce close to 37 million tonnes of crude steel per year. This volume of steel output would make Nippon Steel the second largest steelmaker in the world, putting it well ahead of Baosteel – the current number two (making ~31 mt steel / year) – although still well behind ArcelorMittal (who produced 77.5 mt crude steel in 2010).

On October 1, 2012, Nippon Steel formally merged with Sumitomo Metal Industries at a ratio of 0.735 Nippon Steel shares per Sumitomo Metal share. The merged stock is listed (under number 5401, the old Nippon Steel number) as Nippon Steel & Sumitomo Metal Corp. The logistics branches of both companies are announced to be merged on April 1, 2013, under the name "Nippon Steel & Sumikin Logistics Co., Ltd.", wholly owned by Nippon Steel & Sumitomo Metal Corporation. The merged company planned to publish a common fact book in the summer of 2013.

On April 1, 2019, the Japanese name of the company was changed from Nippon Steel & Sumitomo Metal Corporation to Nippon Steel Corporation.

=== Present ===
In May 2020, Nippon Steel announced that it would suspend operations of four furnaces, one of which permanently, as it booked an annual loss in FY 2019. On June 18, 2025, Nippon Steel completed an acquisition of US Steel for a reported $14.1 billion, at $55-a-share.

== Major plant locations ==
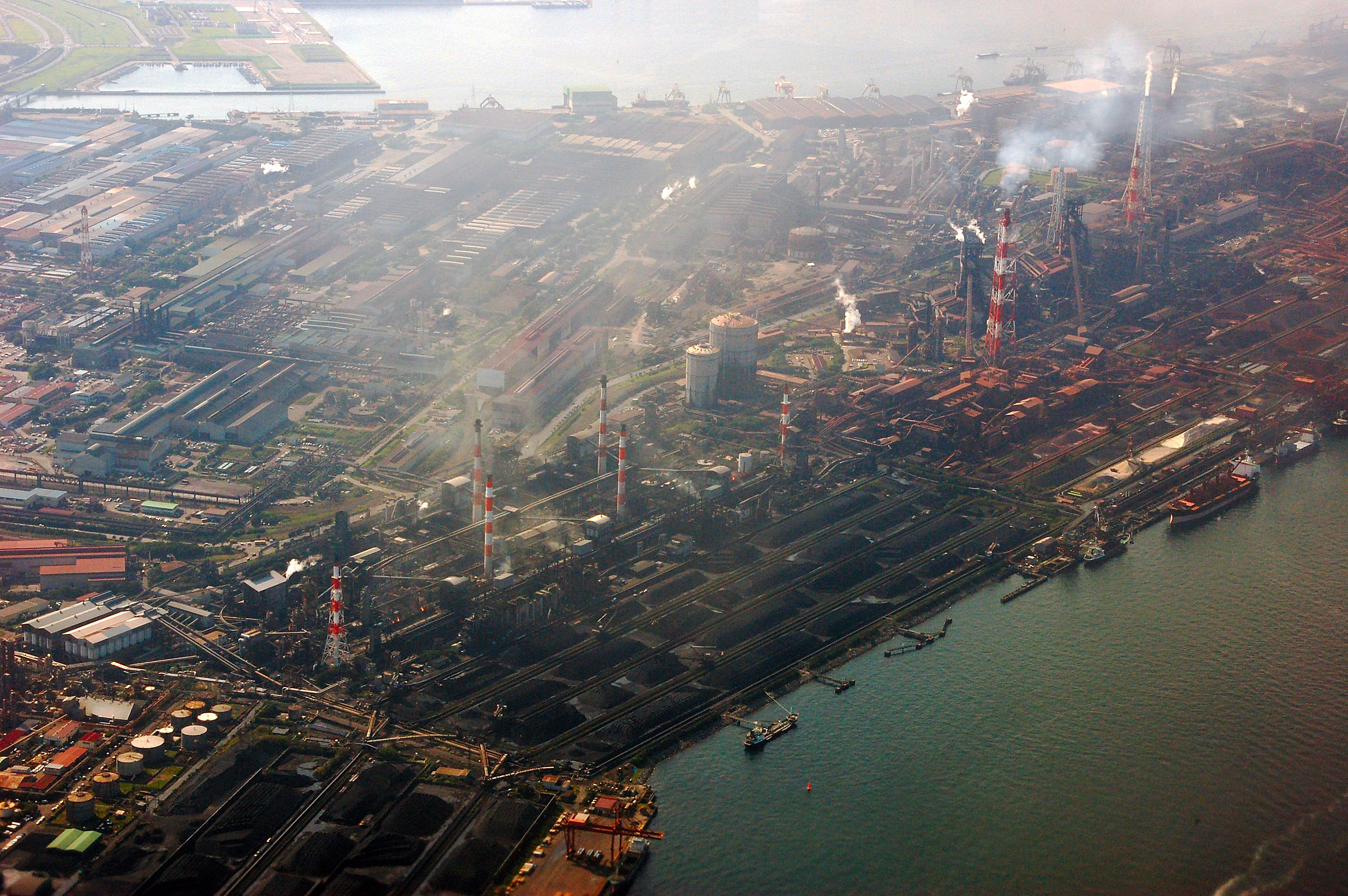
Kimitsu Steel Works

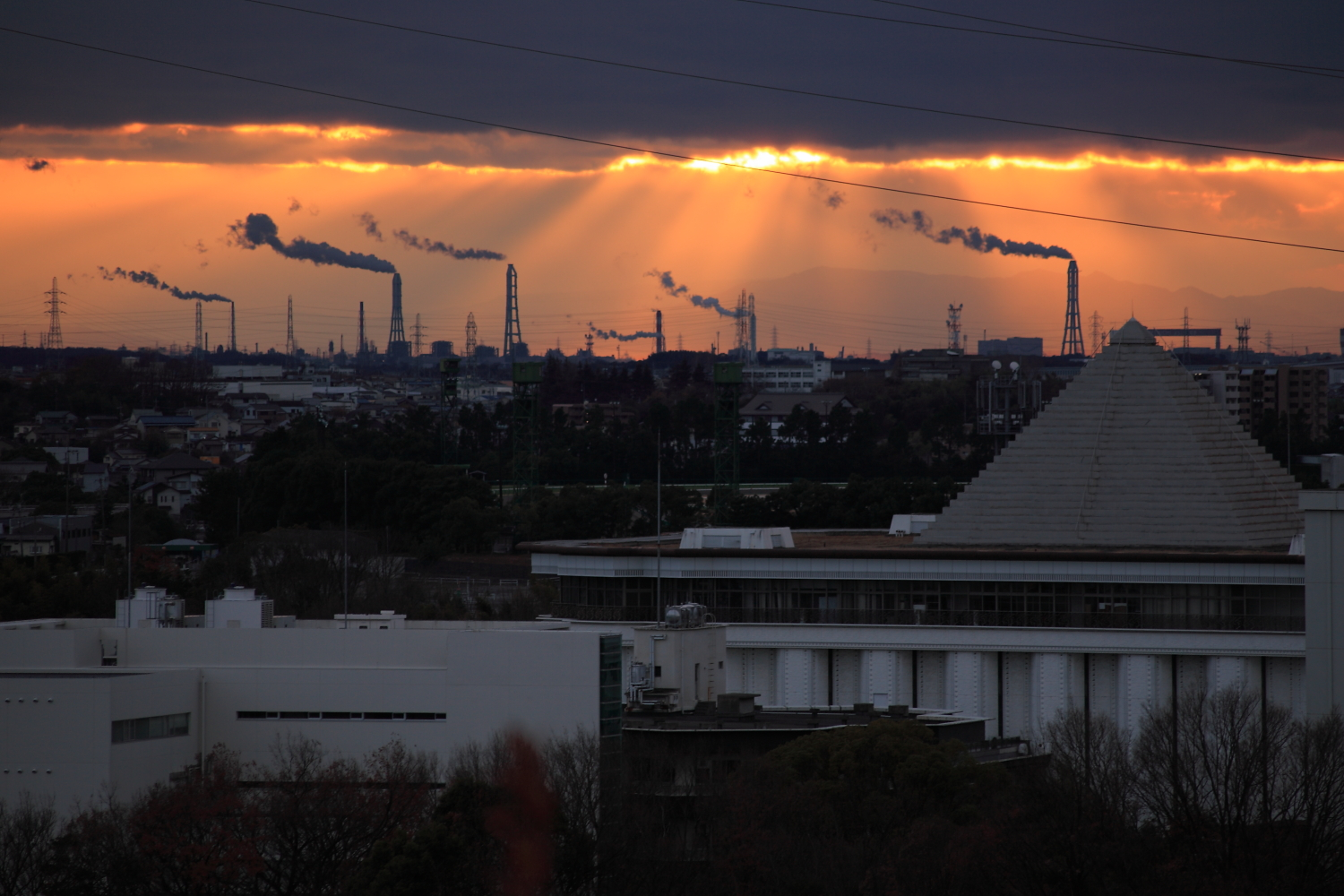
Nagoya Works Ltd.

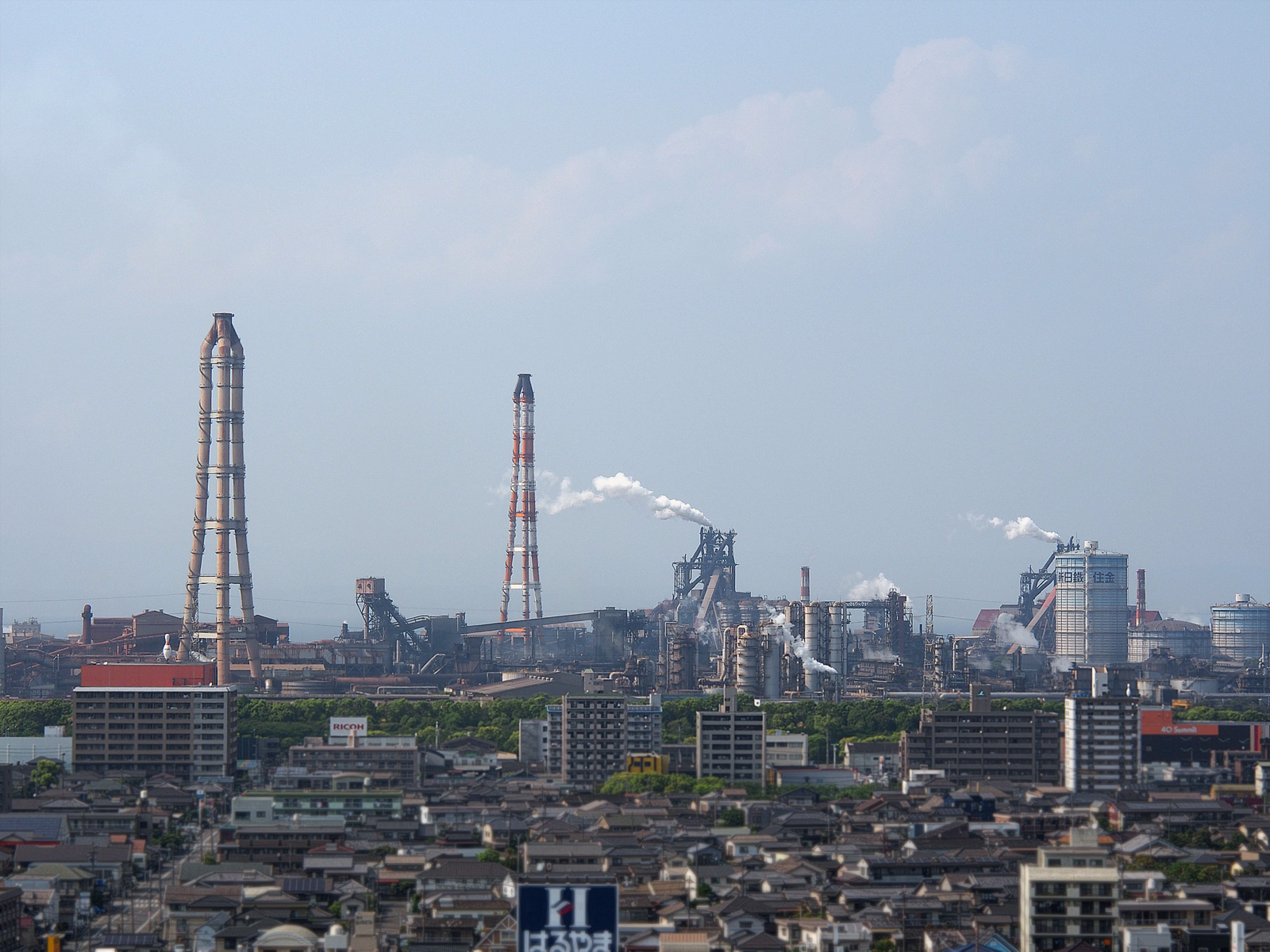
Oita Steel Works (Oita district)

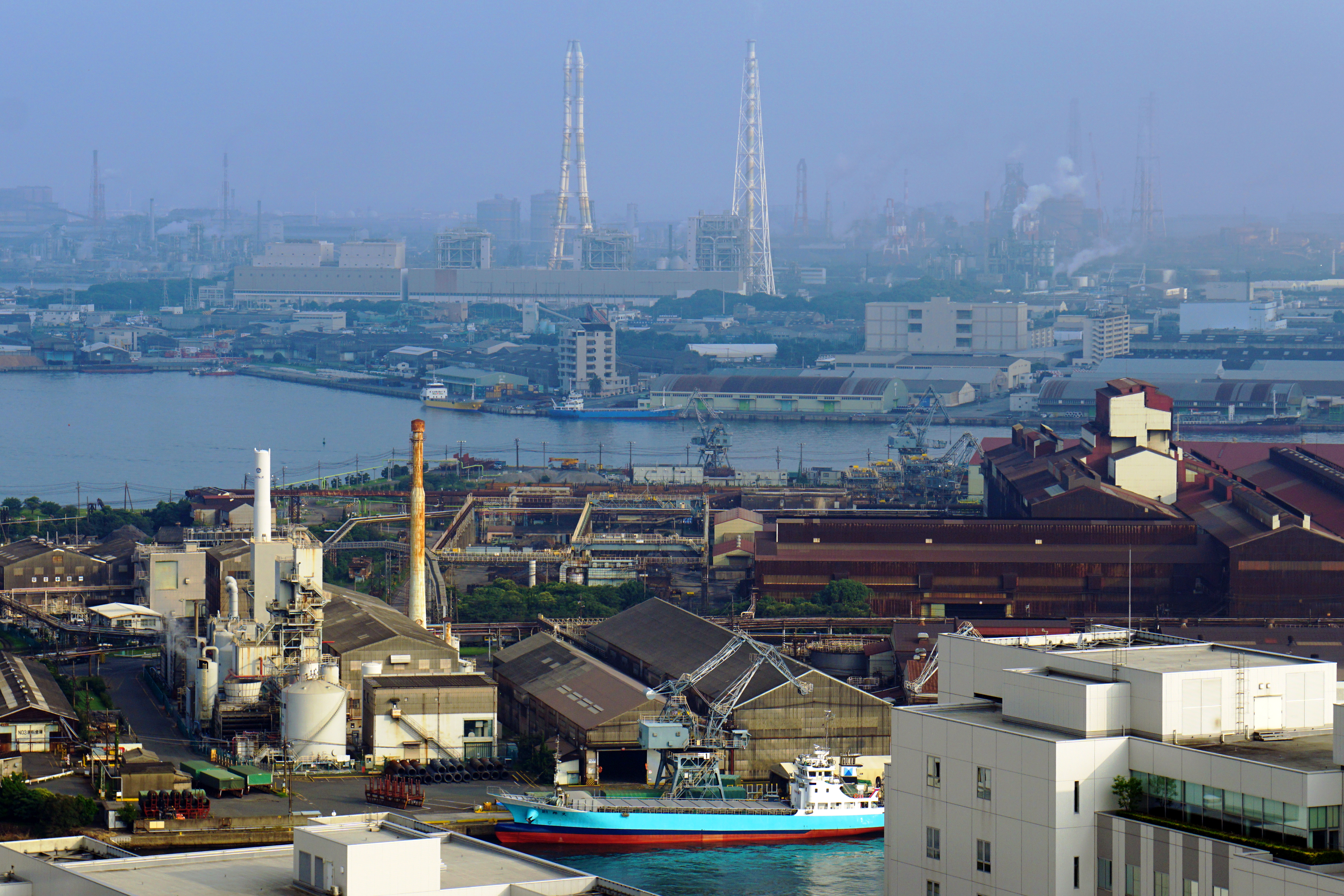
Yahata Steel Works

- Muroran, Hokkaido
- Kamaishi, Iwate Prefecture
- Kimitsu, Chiba Prefecture: Kimitsu Steel Works
- Tokyo
- Tōkai, Aichi Prefecture (Nagoya)
- Sakai, Osaka Prefecture
- Himeji, Hyōgo Prefecture (Hirohata)
- Hikari, Yamaguchi Prefecture – steel piping
- Kitakyushu, Fukuoka Prefecture (Yahata)
- Oita, Oita Prefecture

=== Added after Sumitomo merger ===
- Kashima, Ibaraki
- Jōetsu, Niigata (Naoetsu)
- Amagasaki, Hyōgo
- Osaka
- Wakayama
- Kitakyushu, Fukuoka (Kokura)

=== Joint ventures ===
- New Carlisle, Indiana, USA (built 1991)
- AM/NS Calvert. Formerly named ThyssenKrupp Steel USA and located in Calvert, Alabama, the facility was purchased from ThyssenKrupp through a 50/50 joint partnership with ArcelorMittal in February 2014 for $1.5 billion and renamed AM/NS Calvert. A greenfield construction project which began in 2007, the facility began operation in 2010 and has a production capacity of 5.3 million tons and includes a hot strip mill, cold roll mill and 4 coating lines. Products from the facility are marketed in the NAFTA region through managing partner ArcelorMittal.
- Nippon Steel Trading Co., Ltd., has set up a joint venture with three Indonesian local companies to produce 120,000 tons of sheet steel for the automotive industry. Nippon Steel would control a 30 percent share of the joint venture, PT IndoJapan Steel Center. It is located in the Mitra Karawang Industrial Estate, West Java in a 4.8-hectare area with total investment for first phase $38 million and was expected to start operating in January 2013.
- POSCO-Nippon Steel RHF Joint Venture, Co., Ltd., located in Pohang, South Korea. Using rotary hearth furnace technology, the company recycles sludge and dust coming out from the POSCO plants.
- Nippon and POSCO reached an agreement in 2023 with Teck Resources to exchange minority interests into some Teck operations for a 20% interest in Elk Valley Resources ("EVR").

== Controversies ==
=== Espionage from a Korean steelmaker ===
In May 2012, Nippon Steel filed a lawsuit against POSCO, a Korean steelmaker established in the 1960s with technical assistance from Nippon Steel, for illegally acquiring the technology for grain-oriented electrical steel sheets developed by Nippon Steel. It was alleged that POSCO hired ex-employees of Nippon Steel to obtain the technology. An ex-POSCO official stated that the company's Tokyo research centre was effectively an espionage base, whose primary purpose was to collect information about Japanese steel companies on orders from the Korean head office.

The lawsuit was settled in 2015 through an agreement under which the Korean steelmaker paid 30 billion yen (US$300 million at the time) to Nippon Steel. After the settlement, the two companies renewed their strategic partnership agreement, but by 2024, Nippon Steel had sold all its shares in POSCO.

=== Korean forced labor compensations ===
On October 30, 2018, a lawsuit which was originally filed in 2005 concluded with Nippon being ordered by the South Korea Supreme Court to pay compensation totaling 100 million won ($87,680) each to four surviving Koreans who were victims of forced labor at a steel mill which was supervised by Nippon's predecessor company Japan Iron & Steel Co. during Japan's colonial rule of Korea The asset seizure ordered by the Korean supreme court involves Nippon's stake in PNR, the POSCO-Nippon joint venture. A Nippon spokesman called the decision "deeply regretful," while also promising a review of the ruling. The Japanese Minister of Foreign Affairs Taro Kono maintained that the matter "has been resolved following the Treaty on Basic Relations between Japan and the Republic of Korea". On December 21, 2023, the South Korean Supreme Court would again rule against Nippon in another forced labor lawsuit, with Nippon being ordered to give 100 million won (about $76,700) to seven Korean plaintiffs and their families. On January 11, 2024, the South Korean Supreme Court would uphold a lower court ruling which required Nippon to pay forced labor compensation to family members of a South Korean man who was subjected to forced labor.

=== Acquisition of U.S. Steel ===
On December 18, 2023, Nippon Steel announced an agreement with U.S. Steel to purchase the company for US$14.1 billion, or US$55 per share, pending regulatory approval; when including U.S. Steel debts, the price of the acquisition rises to US$14.9 billion. The company agreed to maintain a headquarters for US Steel in its hometown of Pittsburgh and honor all steelworker union contracts. On March 14, 2024, however, U.S. President Joe Biden came out against Nippon Steel's bid to acquire U.S. Steel and declared he would use U.S. regulatory authorities to block the planned acquisition; The acquisition deal was also opposed by the United Steelworkers (USW) labor union. In March 2024, USW International President David McCall stated that Biden's decision to support keeping U.S. Steel domestically owned and operated "should end the debate."

In 2024, the company announced that it was proceeding with the acquisition of US Steel, despite President Biden's position. Nippon Steel Trading committed to the United Steelworkers (USW) union, which had also opposed the deal, to invest an additional $1.4 billion and also guaranteed that, subject to a number of conditions, there would be no layoffs or plant closures until September 2026. On January 3, 2025, Biden officially blocked Nippon's Steel bid to purchase U.S. Steel. Nippon Steel filed a lawsuit to challenge the decision to block the deal.

On June 18, 2025, the acquisition was finalized.

== Environmental record ==
In 2005, the Nippon Steel corporation made a plan to step up its capacity for recycling waste plastics into coke by 30%. Coke is a main resource in steel production. To manage the load they have invested ¥4 billion (about $38.2 million) to install equipment at Oita Mill and set up a second furnace at Kyushu facility.

In 2006, Nippon Steel and Mitsubishi Heavy Industries, Ltd. (MHI) jointly created a high tensile strength steel. The first application this steel was used for was the hulls of container ships. This steel allows the ships to be just as strong without the thick steel that it was requiring for them to grow in size. The smaller thickness allows the ships to attain a greater fuel-efficiency, cutting down on the environmental load of the ships.

Nippon Steel announced a pilot project to process waste food into ethanol in 2006. They have tasked Kitakyushu City with collecting and sorting the food waste and Nishihara Co., a waste management company, with developing new technologies to implement the sorted collecting system. To minimize costs they will use waste heat from an existing incineration facility that had not been effectively utilized, and the residue left after ethanol recovery will be burned in this incinerator.

== See also ==
- Kashima Antlers
- Nippon Steel Yawata S.C., former company football club, based near the Yahata plant and originally owned by it before the Fuji Steel merger
- NS Solutions
