= Sumitomo Metal Industries =

Japanese steel manufacturer

Sumitomo Metal Industries, Ltd.

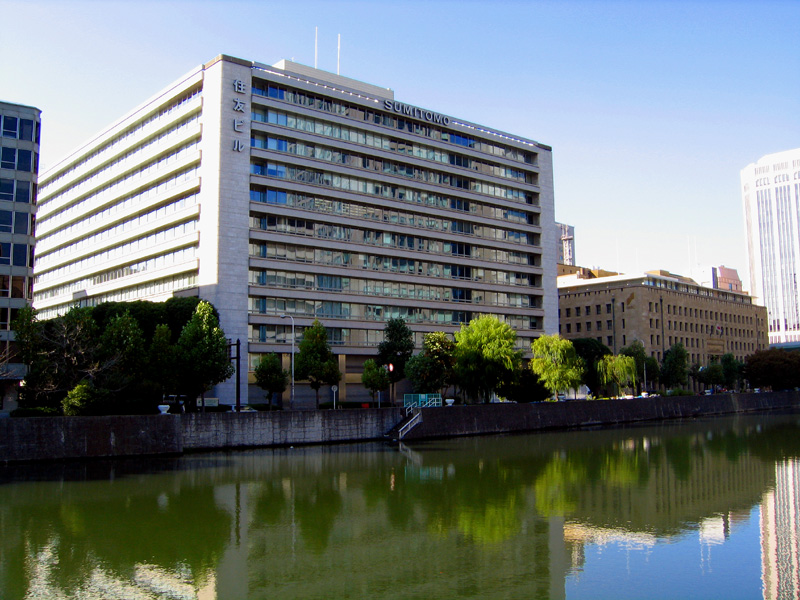
- Headquarters in Chūō-ku, Osaka
- Native name: 住友金属工業株式会社
- Romanized name: Sumitomo Kinzoku Kōgyō Kabushiki-gaisha
- Formerly: Shin-Fuso Metal Industries, Ltd. (1949-1952)
- Company type: Public KK
- Traded as: TYO: 5405
- Industry: Steel
- Founded: July 1, 1949; 76 years ago
- Defunct: October 1, 2012; 13 years ago
- Fate: Merged with Nippon Steel Corporation
- Successor: Nippon Steel & Sumitomo Metal
- Headquarters: Kitahama, Chūō-ku, Osaka, Japan

Sumitomo Metal Industries, Ltd. (住友金属工業株式会社, Sumitomo Kinzoku Kōgyō Kabushiki-gaisha) was a steel manufacturer based in Osaka, Japan until it merged with Nippon Steel Corporation in 2012 to form Nippon Steel & Sumitomo Metal Corporation, the third largest steel manufacturer in the world as of 2015.

Its origins as a modern company date from 1897, when Sumitomo Copper works was opened in Osaka, and as a steelmaker from 1901, when Sumitomo Steel works began operation.

It was the third largest integrated steel manufacturer in Japan with three integrated steelworks (Wakayama, Wakayama; Kainan, Wakayama; and Kashima, Ibaraki) and several other manufacturing plants and one of the largest manufacturers of Seamless Pipes and Tubes, such as OCTG and Line-pipes used for exploitation of petroleums and LNGs.

Sumitomo Metal Industries was the parent company of Sumitomo Sitix until Sumitomo Sitix was merged with Mitsubishi's silicon division to create SUMCO (Sumitomo Mitsubishi). SUMCO is currently the second largest silicon wafer manufacturer.

On October 1, 2012, Nippon Steel formally merged with Sumitomo Metal Industries; the merged stock is listed (under number 5401, the old Sumitomo Metals number 5405 being discontinued) as Nippon Steel & Sumitomo Metal Corp.

Kashima Antlers, the famous Japanese football (soccer) club, started as the club of Sumitomo Metal Industries. Founded in 1947 in Osaka, it moved to near the Kashima, Ibaraki plant in 1975.

== See also ==
- Sumitomo Precision Products
