= Itochu Techno-Solutions =

Japanese IT service company

Itochu Techno-Solutions Co., Ltd.
- Native name: 伊藤忠テクノソリューションズ株式会社
- Romanized name: Itōchū Tekuno-soryūshonzu Kabushiki-gaisha
- Formerly: Itochu Techno-Science
- Company type: Public
- Traded as: TYO: 4739
- Industry: Information technology
- Predecessors: Itochu Data Systems; Hamilton Avnet Electronics; CRC Solutions
- Founded: April 1, 1972; 54 years ago
- Headquarters: Kamiyacho Trust Tower, Tokyo, Japan
- Key people: Ichiro Tsuge (president & CEO)
- Services: IT lifecycle support Data centers Cloud computing Information security
- Revenue: JPY 487.0 bn (FY2020)
- Net income: JPY 28.46 bn (FY2020)
- Number of employees: 10,565 (2024)
- Parent: Itochu Corporation
- Website: www.ctc-g.co.jp

Itochu Techno-Solutions Co., Ltd. (伊藤忠テクノソリューションズ株式会社, Itōchū Tekuno-soryūshonzu Kabushiki-gaisha; abbreviated CTC) is a Japanese systems integrator based in Kasumigaseki, Chiyoda, Tokyo. It is a publicly traded subsidiary of Itochu Corporation.

CTC is a Japanese partner of numerous multinational IT vendors including Avaya, IBM, Cisco Systems, EMC, Hewlett-Packard, Hitachi, Microsoft, NetApp, Oracle, Symantec and VMware. The company has offices throughout Japan as well as in the United States, Singapore and Malaysia.

The company abbreviation CTC is derived from the company philosophy, "Challenging Tomorrow's Changes". Thus, the company is called CTC, especially among computer businesses in Japan.

== History ==
Itochu (then known as C. Itoh & Co.) set up CTC's predecessor Itochu Data Systems in the early 1970s to sell American computer equipment in Japan. Itochu middle manager Nobuo Hiroi was tapped to head the company and hired a number of outside employees such as Hiro Satake, a former Japan salesman for NCR. He also introduced a merit pay system, which was rare in Japan at the time. In 1983, CTC became a distributor for Sun Microsystems and helped to pioneer workstation-based computing in Japan. Satake became president in 1994 and inked sales relationships with Cisco Systems and Oracle.

In the late 1990s, as Itochu reeled from losses from the Japanese asset price bubble, Itochu president Uichiro Niwa decided to float CTC on the stock market. CTC had its initial public offering in December 1999, and its market capitalization immediately exceeded that of its parent company, Itochu. One year later, CTC was valued at around $20 billion while Itochu was valued at only $8 billion.
