= Sumitomo Heavy Industries =

Japanese manufacturing, industrial machinery and engineering company

Sumitomo Heavy Industries, Ltd.

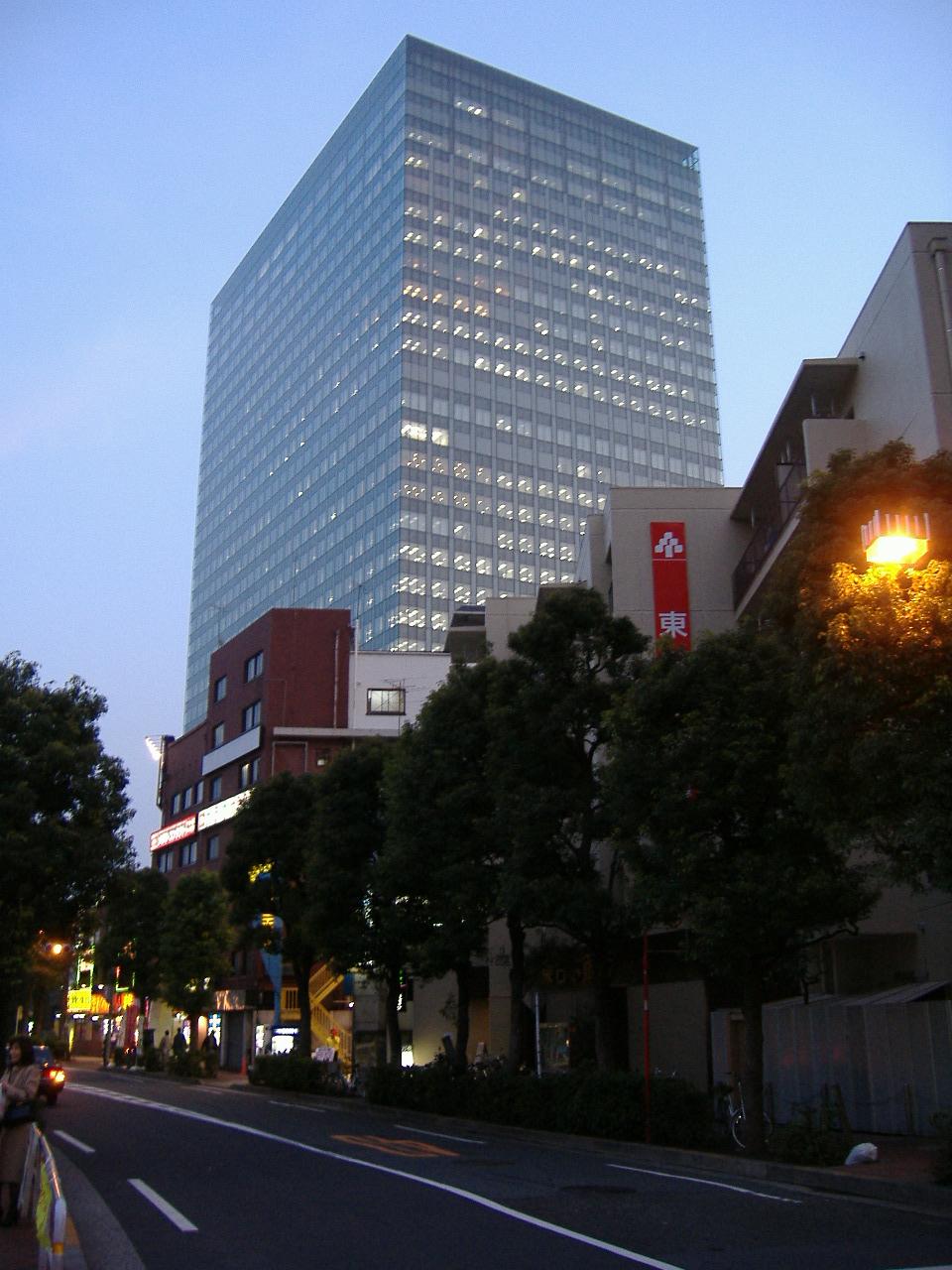
- Native name: 住友重機械工業株式会社
- Type: Public (K.K)
- Traded as: TYO: 6302; Nikkei 225 Component
- Industry: Machinery
- Founded: November 20, 1888; 137 years ago
- Headquarters: ThinkPark Tower, 2-1-1 Osaki, Shinagawa-ku, Tokyo, 141-6025 Japan
- Area served: Global
- Key people: Shinji Shimomura (President and CEO)
- Products: Heavy machinery; Shipbuilding; Mass-production machinery; Environmental equipment; Food machinery; Medical systems; Plastics machinery; Road machinery; Construction machinery
- Revenue: ▲$ 6.02 billion (FY 2014) (¥ 615.2 billion) (FY 2014)
- Net income: ▲$ 175.3 million (FY 2014) (¥ 17.89 billion) (FY 2014)
- Number of employees: 17,941 (consolidated as of March 31, 2014)
- Website: Sumitomo Heavy Industries

Sumitomo Heavy Industries, Ltd. (住友重機械工業株式会社, Sumitomo Jūkikai Kōgyō Kabushiki-gaisha) (SHI) is an integrated manufacturer of industrial machinery, defence products, ships, bridges and steel structure, equipment for environmental protection, including recycling, power transmission equipment, plastic molding machines, laser processing systems, particle accelerators, material handling systems, cancer diagnostic and treatment equipment and others.

== History ==
In 1888, a company was formed to provide equipment repair services to the Besshi copper mine. Almost 50 years later, in 1934, the company incorporated as Sumitomo Machinery Co., Ltd. to manufacture machinery for the steel and transportation industries in support of that period of rapid economic growth.

In 1969, Sumitomo Machinery Co., Ltd. merged with Uraga Heavy Industries Co., Ltd. to create Sumitomo Heavy Industries, Ltd. Today, Sumitomo Heavy Industries manufactures injection molding machines, laser systems, semiconductor machinery and liquid crystal production machinery.

In 1979, the company famously built the Seawise Giant, an Ultra Large Crude Carrier (ULCC) supertanker; the longest ship ever built.

In April 2021, it was reported that SHI has ceased making light machine guns for the JSDF, citing a bleak economic prospects in the arms sector.

=== Legal ===
In March 2005, Sumitomo Heavy Industries underwent an inspection by the Japan Fair Trade Commission (JFTC) for suspected collusion regarding contracts for flood control gates on rivers and dams commissioned by the Ministry of Land, Infrastructure, Transport and Tourism, the Water Resources Agency, and local governments.

In May 2005, the JFTC filed criminal charges with the Public Prosecutor's Office for violations of the Antimonopoly Act against Sumitomo Heavy Industries and seven other companies for engaging in collusion in the bidding process for bridge construction projects commissioned by the former Japan Highway Public Corporation and the Ministry of Land, Infrastructure, Transport and Tourism (see ja:橋梁談合事件).

On June 12, 2006, the Osaka District Public Prosecutors Office Special Investigation Department indicted Sumitomo Heavy Industries and ten other companies for colluding in the construction of sewage and sludge treatment facilities commissioned by local governments, violating the Antimonopoly Act. As a result, the company was subjected to a nine-month suspension from government contracts by the Ministry of Land, Infrastructure, Transport and Tourism.

On May 25, 2012, it was revealed through a surprise audit by the Board of Audit that Sumitomo Heavy Industries and its subsidiary Sumitomo Heavy Industries Special Equipment Services had over-reported working hours and inflated billing amounts for maintenance and repairs of autocannon systems since the 1970s, leading to a suspension from government contracts.

In February 2013, the company's suspension ended after it paid a penalty of ¥2.3 billion due to fraudulent billing practices. However, in December 2013, it was discovered that the company had falsified test data for 5,000 units of 5.56mm machine guns (license-produced Minimi light machine guns), 7.62mm vehicle-mounted machine guns (Type 74), and 12.7mm heavy machine guns (license-produced M2 Browning), leading to another five-month suspension from government contracts.

On October 24, 2014, Sumitomo Heavy Industries and its employees were referred to prosecutors for violating the Explosives Control Law and the Firearms and Swords Control Law for conducting unauthorized test firings of machine guns manufactured by the company.

On October 1, 2018, Sumitomo Heavy Industries' subsidiary, Sumitomo Heavy Industries High Metax, was found to have falsified inspection data on hardness and components of rolling rolls, affecting steel plate production equipment parts.

On January 7, 2020, a former secretary of the Sumitomo Heavy Industries Labor Union was arrested on suspicion of embezzling ¥50 million from a retirement savings account. Ultimately, a total of approximately ¥336.6 million was confirmed to have been embezzled, and on June 19 of the same year, the Tokyo District Court sentenced the former secretary to eight years in prison.

On May 20, 2021, Sumitomo Heavy Industries revealed that design drawings for sample parts used in test machine guns for the Japan Ground Self-Defense Force had been leaked to China. The Ministry of Economy, Trade and Industry issued a severe warning to the company and its subcontractor for violating the Foreign Exchange and Foreign Trade Act.

On May 2, 2024, it was revealed that Sumitomo Heavy Industries and its subsidiary, Sumitomo Nako Forklift, had committed inspection fraud during routine checks of forklifts. Workers had omitted necessary steps, such as removing brake components for internal inspection, leading to the discovery of four instances of inspection fraud across two vehicles. Investigations are ongoing to check for similar violations.

== Labour issues ==
A male employee in his 30s, who was employed by the company in 2014 and subsequently seconded to Sumiju Forging, an affiliated company, attempted to commit suicide by jump from the roof of his dormitory in November 2016 and survived but was saved and treated for mental illness. The man appears to have been working overwork since around May 2016 due to a combination of normal work, preparation for audits and research assignments. The Labour Standards Inspection Office of Yokosuka certified the work accident as caused by the onset of adjustment disorder on 30 October 2018.

== Products ==
- Sumitomo NTK-62 Machine gun
- Seawise Giant, the largest ship ever built
- Excavator, OEM Suppliers of Case and Link-belt
- Paver
- Gear reducers & Electric Motors
