= Meidensha =

Japanese company

Meidensha Corporation 株式会社明電舎
- Company type: Public K.K.
- Traded as: TYO: 6508; NAG: 6508; Nikkei 225 Component
- Industry: Electrical equipment
- Founded: December 22, 1897
- Founder: Hosui Shigemune
- Headquarters: ThinkPark Tower, 2-1-1 Osaki, Shinagawa-ku, Tokyo, 141-6029 Japan
- Key people: Yuji Hamasaki, (Chairman); Takeshi Miida, (President)
- Products: Social infrastructure systems; Industrial systems; Maintenance and Servicing; Real estate
- Revenue: ▲JPY 230.3 billion (FY 2014) (US$ 1.91 billion) (FY 2014)
- Net income: ▲JPY 6.8 billion (FY 2014) (US$ 56.6 million) (FY 2014)
- Number of employees: ▲9,599(as of March 31, 2020)
- Subsidiaries: 37 (19 in Japan, 18 overseas)(as of 31 March 31, 2019)
- Website: Official website

Meidensha Corporation (株式会社明電舎, Kabushiki Kaisha Meidensha) is a Japanese, Tokyo-based company, engaged in the manufacturing and selling of water treatment equipment, electronic equipment, and information equipment. It is listed on the Tokyo Stock Exchange and is a constituent of the Nikkei 225.

The company was established by Hosui Shigemune for the manufacture of electric motors in Kyobashi, Tokyo.

== Business segments and products ==
The company operates in four business segments:

- Social Infrastructure Systems Business
  - Power generating systems, power transmission & distribution systems
  - Rail electrification, overhead line inspection system
  - Motor power and process control systems
  - Electrical system for water treatment plant, water purification systems, water quality meters, ceramic membranes
- Industrial Systems Business
  - Automobile testing and logistics systems, driving performance simulation systems, motors and inverters
  - Industrial computers, network systems for information industries, supporting software for semiconductor production equipment
- Maintenance and Servicing Business
  - Energy-saving methods, remote management of equipment, maintenance services for semiconductor manufacturing devices, maintenance skills training service
- Real Estate Business
  - Tenancy service and real estate leasing
