= MOS Burger =

International fast-food restaurant chain from Japan

MOS Food Services, Inc.

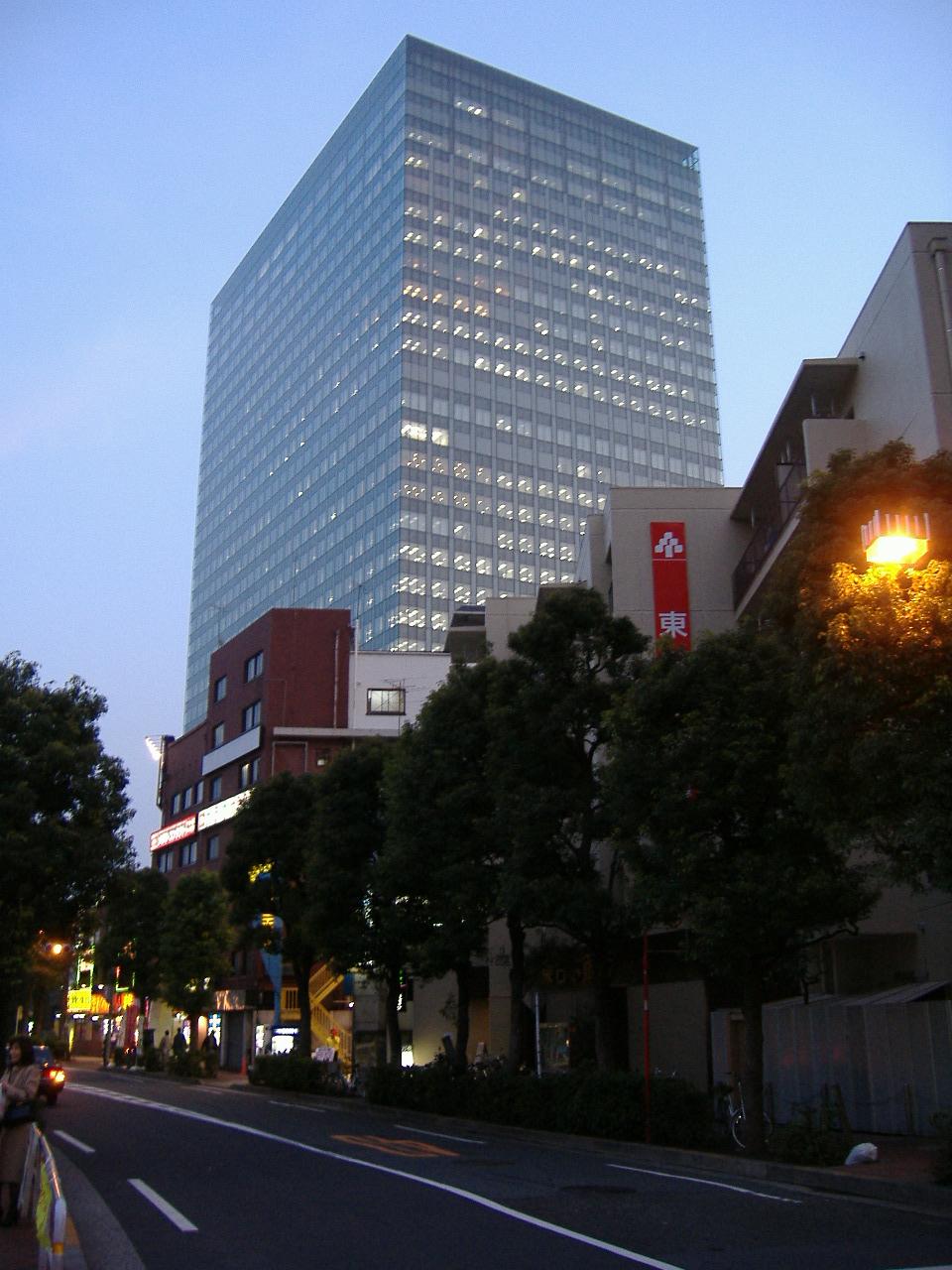
- ThinkPark Tower, the headquarters of MOS Burger
- Type: Public KK
- Traded as: TYO: 8153
- Industry: Foodservice
- Founded: Tokyo, Japan (July 21, 1972; 54 years ago)
- Founder: Atsushi Sakurada (櫻田 厚, Sakurada Atsushi)
- Headquarters: ThinkPark Tower; 2-1-1 Osaki, Shinagawa-ku, Tokyo, 141-6029 Japan
- Key people: Atsushi Sakurada, (CEO and President)
- Products: Fast food; Finance; Sanitation
- Revenue: $ 663 million (FY 2012) (¥ 62.371 billion) (FY 2012)
- Net income: $ 16 million (FY 2012) (¥ 1.52 billion) (FY 2012)
- Number of employees: 1,375 (as of March 2016)
- Subsidiaries: 9
- Website: www.mos.co.jp/global/

MOS Food Services, Inc. (株式会社モスフードサービス, Kabushiki-kaisha Mosu Fūdo Sābisu), doing business as MOS Burger (モスバーガー, Mosu bāgā) (which stands for "Mountain Ocean Sun"), is a multinational fast-food restaurant chain (fast-casual) from Japan. Its headquarters are in the ThinkPark Tower in Ōsaki, Shinagawa, Tokyo. At one time its headquarters were located in Shinjuku, Tokyo.

Japan's answer to McDonald's, it is the second-largest fast-food franchise in Japan (after McDonald's). It owns numerous overseas outlets over East Asia, Southeast Asia and Oceania, including China, Taiwan, Hong Kong, South Korea, Singapore, Thailand, Indonesia and the Philippines. "MOS Burger" is also the name of the standard hamburger offered by the restaurant, having been its first product when it opened in 1972.

MOS Burger's outlets are located in suburban areas to avoid the rising land costs in central areas where the outlets of its competitor McDonald's are located. According to its then-president Kazuo Watanabe, MOS Burger is successful in its home country because it only cooks food when ordered, compared to its competitors which mass produce food items. It also avoids heavy advertising in the mass media; in 1992, its advertising expenses for its home market were US$10 million, compared to McDonald's' US$100 million.

Its working culture emphasises the company's "three attitudes of mind": "to be self-reliant, progressive and sympathetic towards others". Its managerial staff are trained for three months after hiring and are regularly sent for more training in Japan.

As of February 2014 the publicly traded company runs 1,730 MOS Burger and several AEN, Chef's V and Green Grill stores. One slogan used within its stores is "Japanese Fine Burger and Coffee".

== Name ==
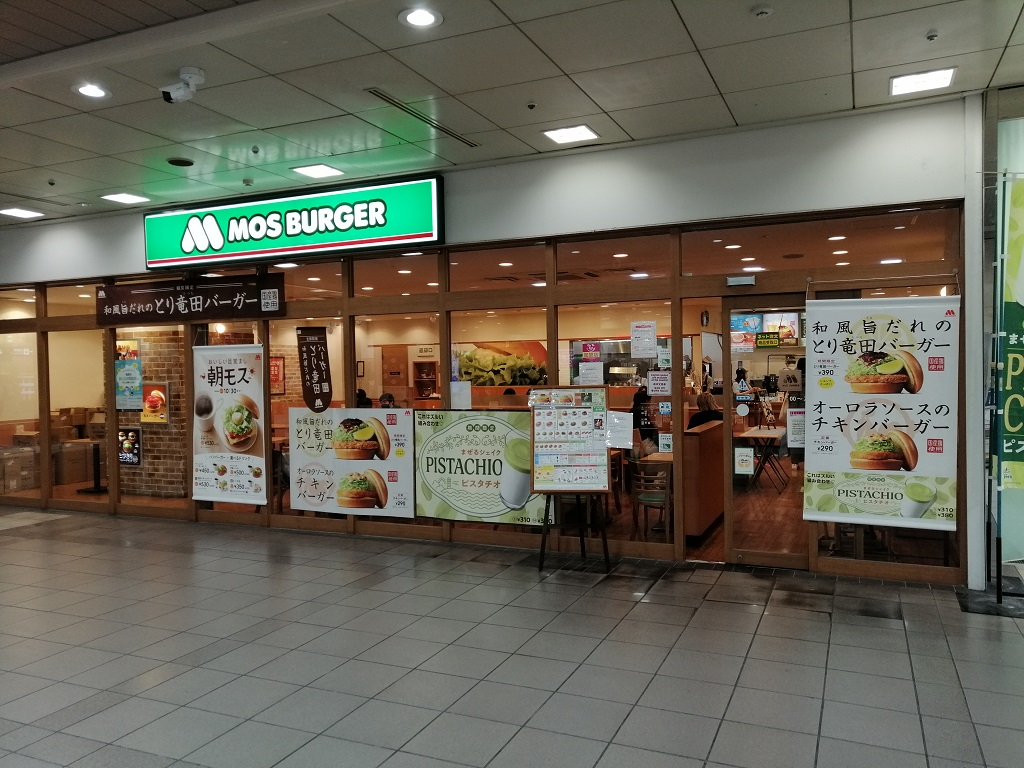
A MOS Burger restaurant in Ichinomiya, Japan, 2023

The company name, styled in all caps: MOS Burger, is a backronym for "Mountain, Ocean, Sun". Despite the backronym being coined by its founder Satoshi Sakurada, no one was able to explain whether mountains, oceans or suns have to do with burgers. The company was originally was a spinoff of Atsushi Sakurada's previous company, Merchandising Organizing System. Later, the company began to use playful English phrases in point-of-purchase marketing materials to explain the name, including "MOSt delicious burger", before it finally settled on the current backronym.

MOS Burger's logo as of 1992 was a yellow M with signage in red, similar to McDonald's.

== History ==
Sakurada, then attached with Nikko Securities' Los Angeles branch in the early 1960s, frequented the Los Angeles chili burger chain Original Tommy's. Wanting to strike out on his own after returning to Japan he decided to adapt the cook-to-order hamburger concept used by Original Tommy's. He also developed the MOS rice burger as an alternative to the hamburger.

As of 1992, MOS Burger had 1,100 outlets in Japan (1,021 in 1991 and 1,200 in 1993), being the country's largest chain. It expects to open 100 more outlets in that year.

Its most popular items were teriyaki burger and rice burger with grilled rice cakes as its patty.

=== International operations ===
MOS Burger began its international expansion in 1989 with Taiwan, where its sukiyaki rice burger was popular with its customers. In 1991, its outlets reach a monthly sales target of between ¥ 5 million and ¥ 10 million.

As of 1992 it had five outlets in Hawaii, four in Taiwan and three noodle houses in the Los Angeles area. Sales of its international outlets reach an estimate of US$3 million. MOS Burger planned to open 500 more outlets in Asia, with 30 in Hong Kong, 250 in South Korea and the rest in Singapore and Taiwan.

In 1992, MOS Burger expanded to Singapore through joint venture Moriyoshi Foods, with its franchisee Palate (S) Pte Ltd. Palate owned 70% of the joint venture while MOS takes the rest of the stake. It plans to open five outlets in 1993 with the first one in Orchard Road open in April. The first outlet opened on 28 May 1993 at Isetan Scotts, with sales for its first year of operation expected to reach S$1.7 million. Palate later planned to open 7 more outlets in two to three years, totalling 30 in ten years. Its second outlet at Junction 8 opened in 1994.

In 1993, MOS Burger planned to expand to China. A joint venture with Yaohan International and a Chinese firm, it planned to open 3,000 outlets by the end of the year.

As of 1996, MOS Burger had five outlets in Singapore, with plans to expand to Hong Kong, Malaysia and Indonesia.

In April 2011, MOS Burger opened its first store at Sunnybank Plaza, in Brisbane, Queensland, Australia. As at September 2021, the company had five stores in Australia, all of which were in Queensland. MOS Burger announced the closure of all its Australian stores in August 2024.

MOS Burger opened in the Philippines in February 2020.

== Products ==
=== MOS Rice Burger ===
The MOS Rice Burger uses a bun made of rice mixed with barley and millet. Rice was first used as a bun in 1987, when the restaurant served the Tsukune Rice Burger, filled with ground chicken and daikon, and seasoned with soy sauce.

The MOS Rice Burger has been imitated by the Taiwanese division of McDonald's, where the rice bun was pan-seared, but it remains a MOS-exclusive item in Japan and other markets.

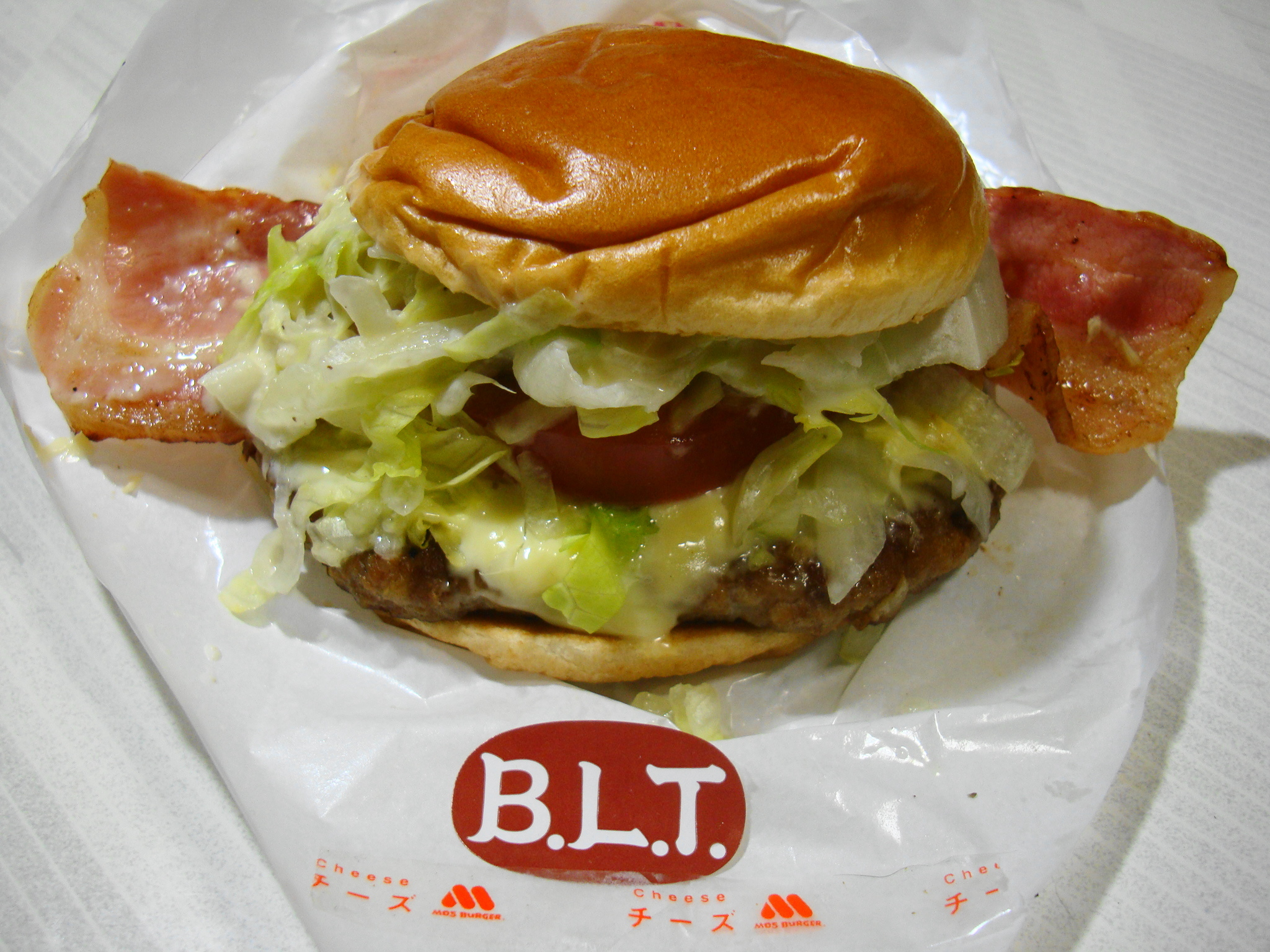
MOS Burger "Tobikiri Hanbāgu Sand B.L.T. slice cheese" (2011)

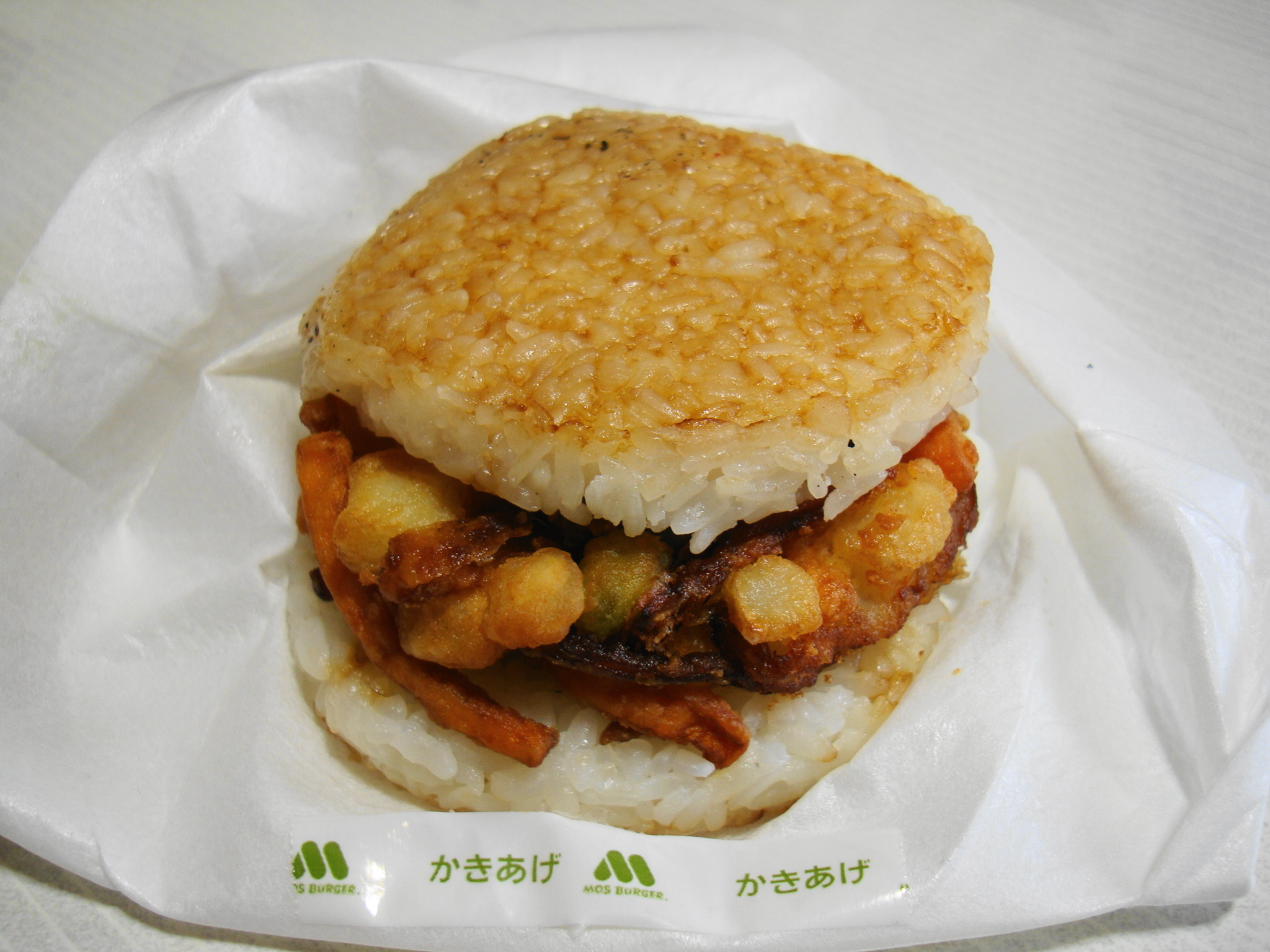
MOS Rice Burger

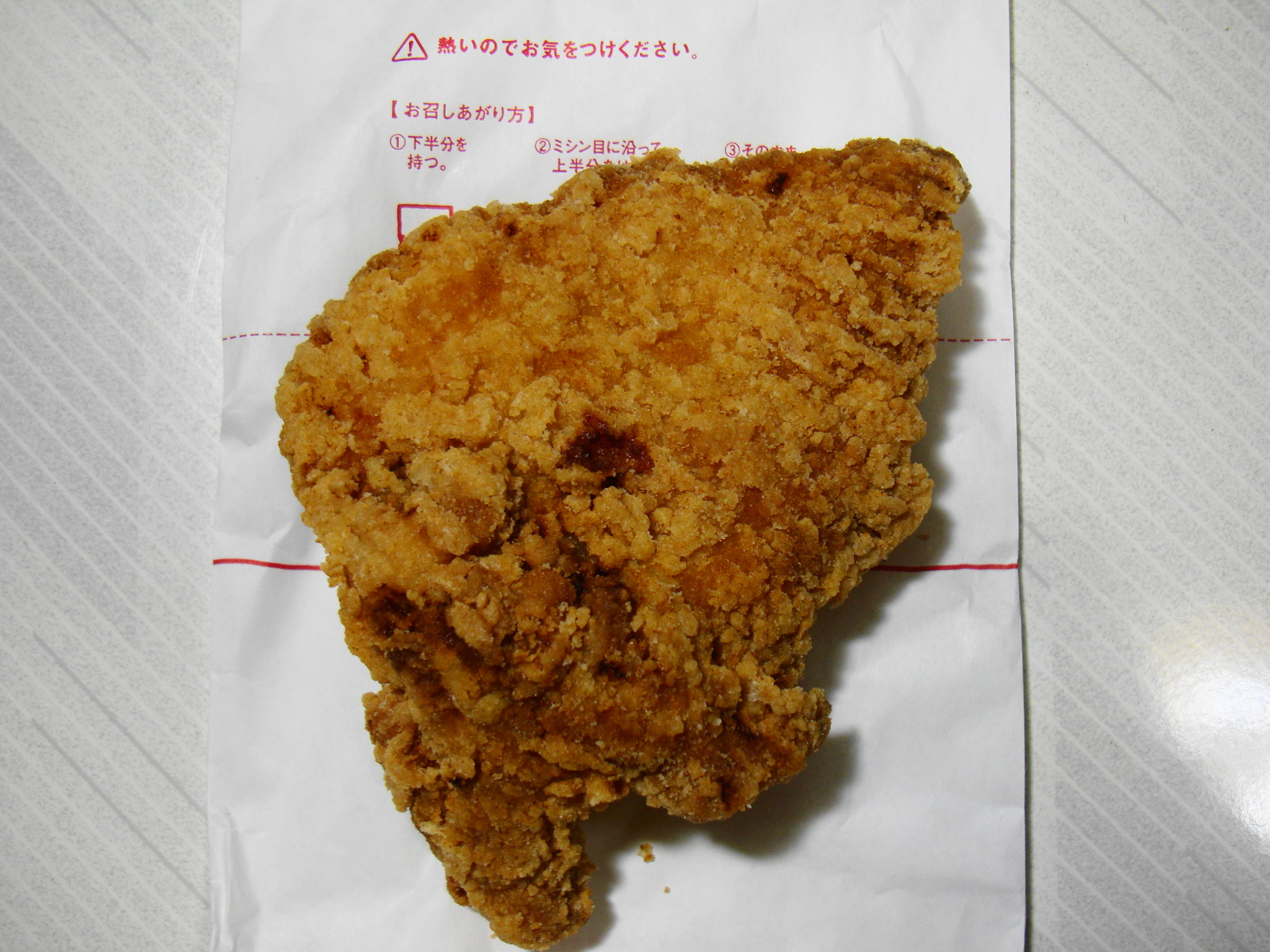
MOS chicken

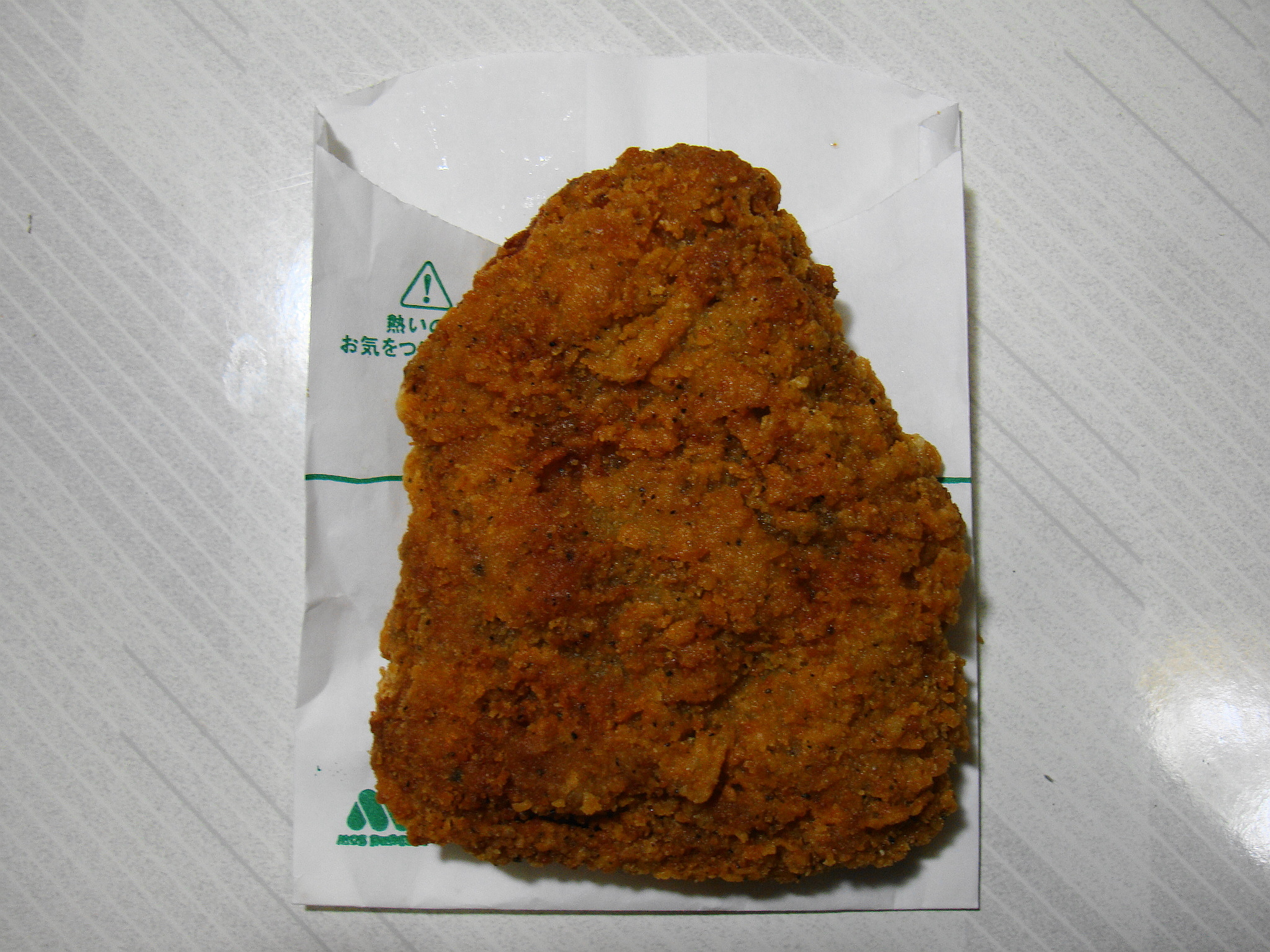
MOS Burger "Kuro-Koshō Chicken", black pepper flavor

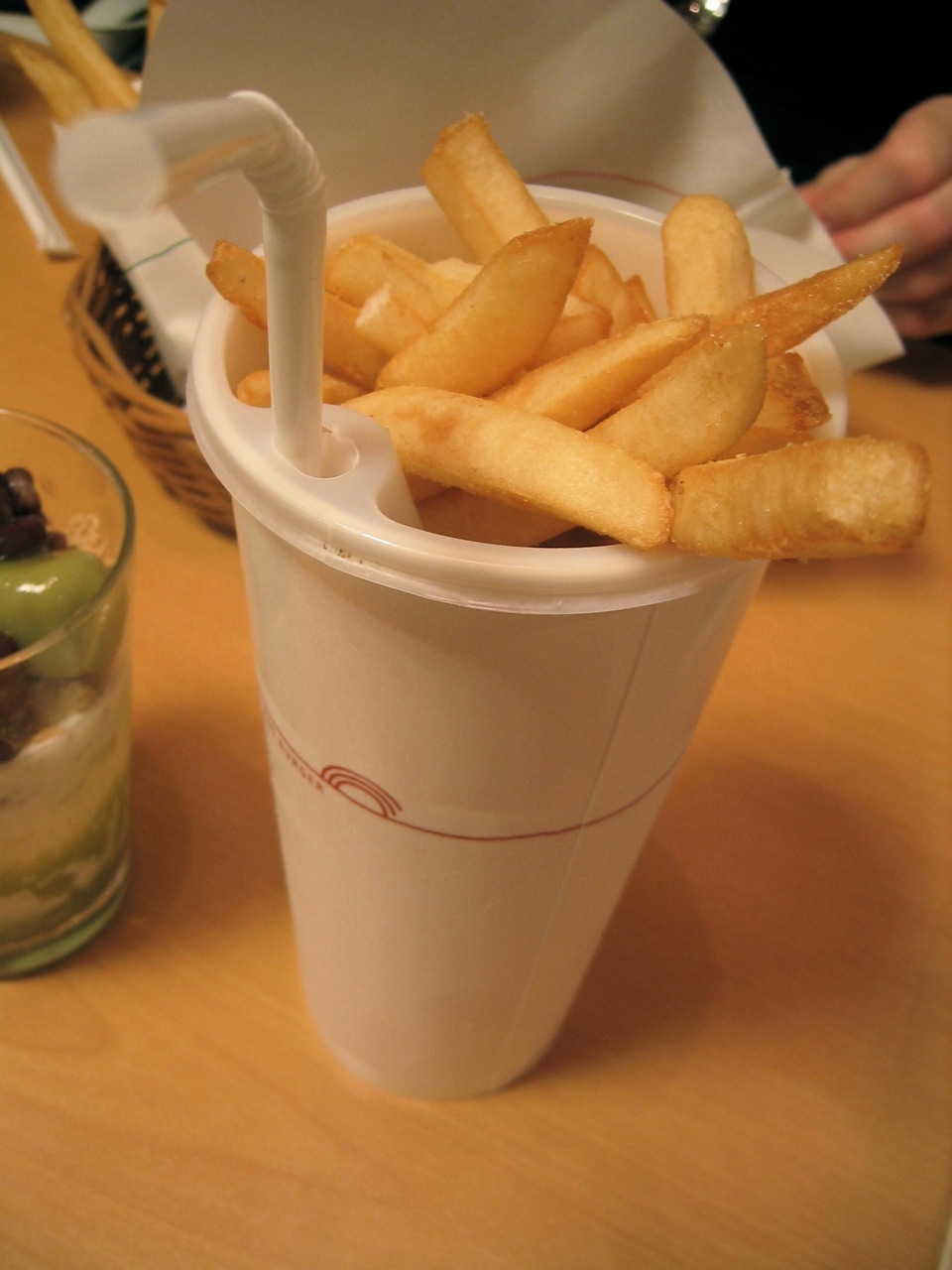
MOS walker (fries and drink)

== See also ==
- List of fast food restaurant chains
- List of hamburger restaurants
