= FN Minimi =

Light machine gun

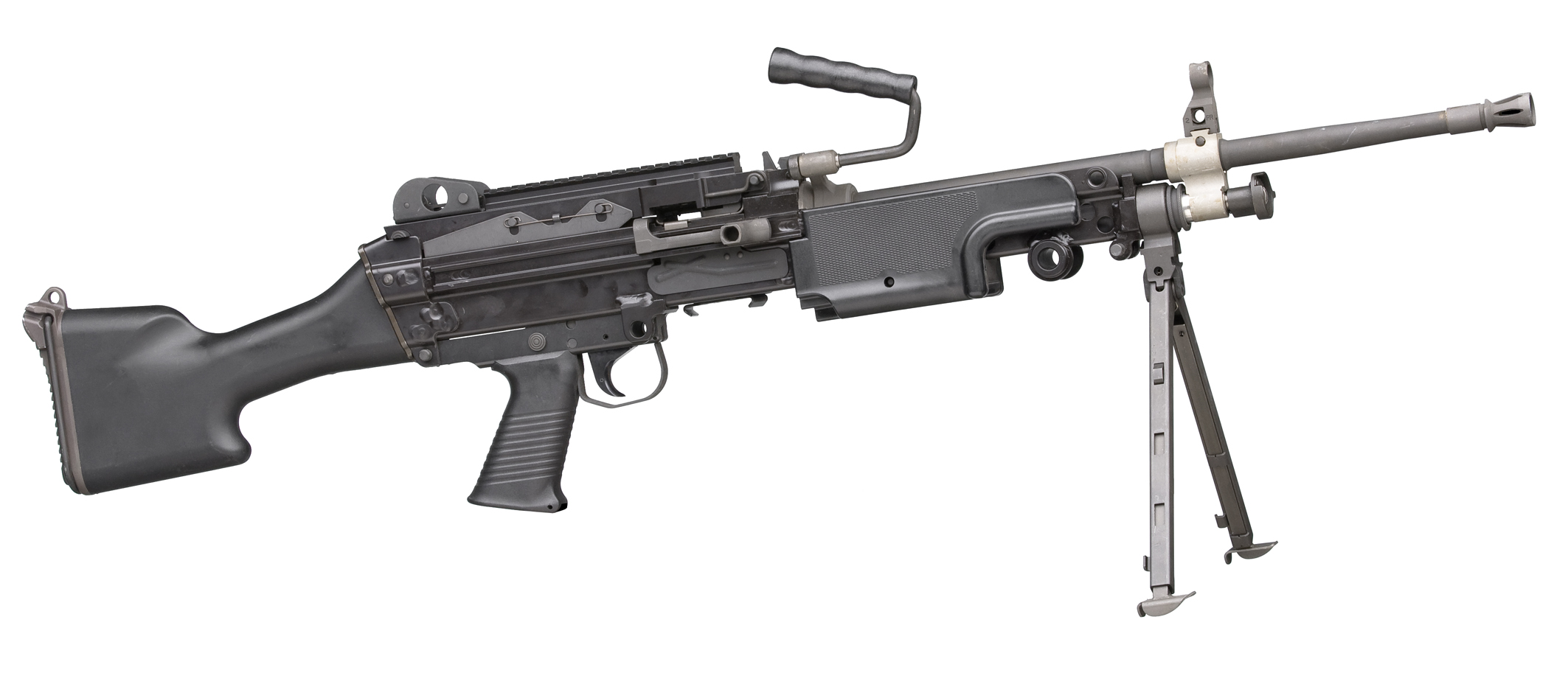
- FN Minimi light machine gun
- Type: Light machine gun Squad automatic weapon
- Place of origin: Belgium

Service history
- In service: 1980–present
- Used by: See Users
- Wars: United States invasion of Panama; Tuareg rebellion (1990–1995); Gulf War; Burundian Civil War; Kosovo War; War in Afghanistan (2001–2021); Moro conflict; Iraq War; Mexican drug war; Communist rebellion in the Philippines; Militias-Comando Vermelho conflict; Second Ivorian Civil War; Libyan Civil War; Syrian Civil War; Northern Mali Conflict; War in Iraq (2013–2017); ISIL insurgency in Tunisia; Yemeni Civil War (2014–present); Saudi Arabian-led intervention in Yemen; Russo-Ukrainian War; Russian invasion of Ukraine

Production history
- Designer: Ernest Vervier
- Designed: Early 1970s
- Manufacturer: FN Herstal; FN USA; Thales Australia; Beretta; Bofors Carl Gustav; Caracal International; Pindad; Sumitomo Heavy Industries
- Produced: 1977–present
- Variants: See Variants

Specifications
- Mass: 7.1 kg (15.7 lb)
- Length: 1,040 mm (40.9 in)
- Barrel length: 465 mm (18.3 in)
- Width: 110 mm (4.3 in)
- Cartridge: 5.56×45mm NATO / 7.62×51mm NATO
- Action: Gas-actuated, open bolt
- Rate of fire: 700–1,150 rounds/min
- Muzzle velocity: 925 m/s (3,035 ft/s)
- Effective firing range: 300–1,000 m (980–3,280 ft) sight adjustments
- Feed system: 100 or 200-round belt contained in a 100-round or 200-round soft pouch, or 200-round box or 30-round M16-type STANAG magazine to 60-round STANAG casket magazine
- Sights: Rear aperture, front post

The FN Minimi (short for French: mini-mitrailleuse; "mini machine gun") is a Belgian 5.56mm or 7.62mm light machine gun, also classified as a squad automatic weapon developed by Ernest Vervier for FN Herstal. Introduced in the late 1970s, it is in service in more than 75 countries. The weapon is manufactured at the FN facility in Herstal and their U.S. subsidiary FN Manufacturing LLC.

The Minimi fires from an open bolt. It is an air-cooled, gas operated long-stroke piston weapon that is capable of fully automatic fire only. It can be belt fed or fired from a magazine. The Minimi is configured in several variants: the Standard model as a platoon or squad support weapon, the shortened Para version for paratroopers and the Vehicle model as secondary armament for fighting vehicles.

== Design details ==
=== Operating mechanism ===
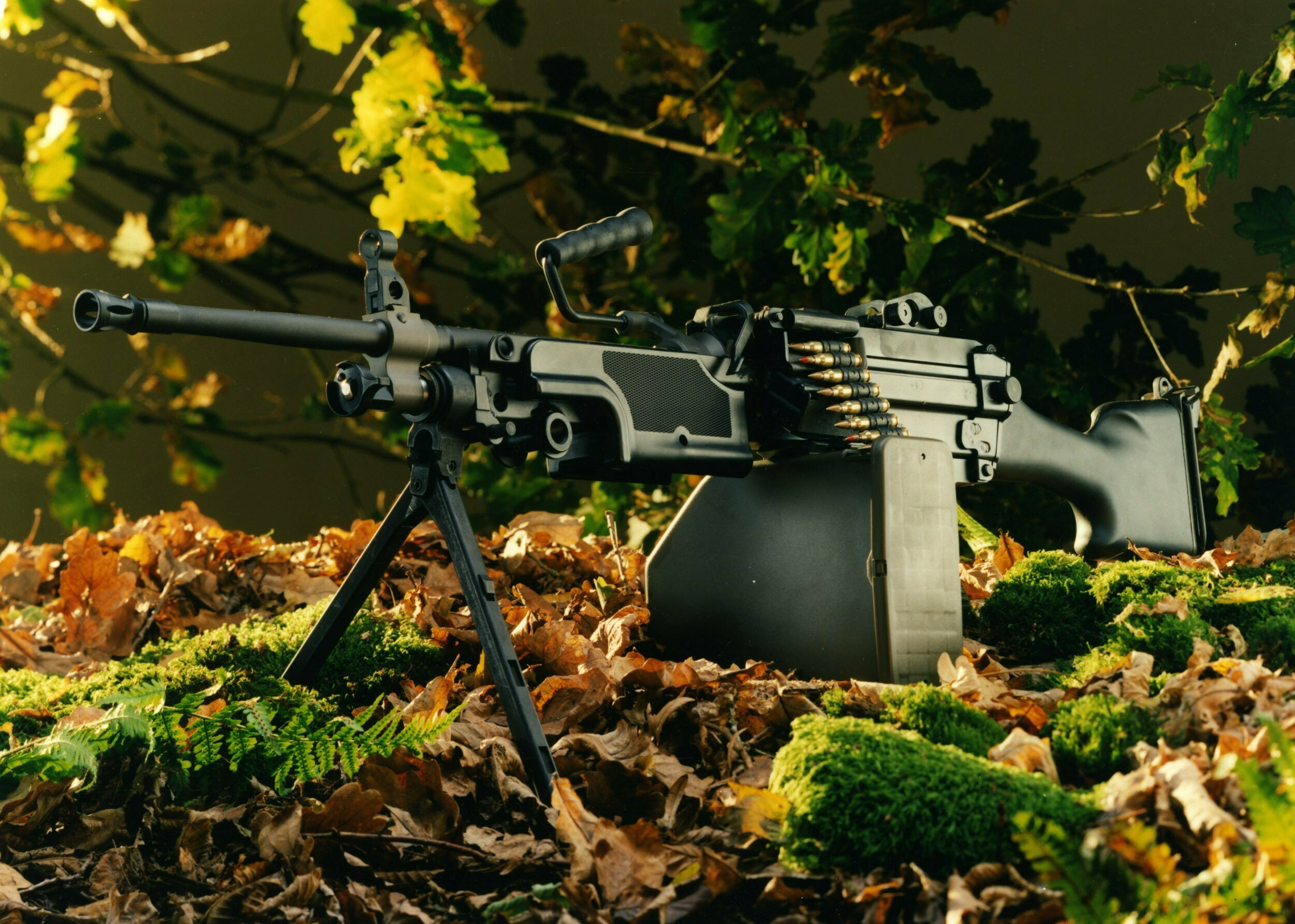
The Minimi in its initial configuration

The Minimi uses a gas-actuated long-stroke piston system. The barrel is locked with a rotary bolt, equipped with two massive locking lugs, forced into battery by a helical camming guide in the bolt carrier. Upon firing, the piston is forced to the rear by expanding propellant gases bled through a port in the barrel near the muzzle end. The piston rod acts against the bolt carrier, which begins its rearward motion guided on two rails welded to the receiver walls, while the bolt itself remains locked. This sequence provides a slight delay that ensures chamber pressure has dropped to a safe level by the time a cam in the bolt carrier rotates and unlocks the bolt, increasing extraction reliability as the empty cartridge casing has had the time to cool down and contract, exerting less friction against the chamber walls.

The Minimi fires from an open bolt, which reduces the danger of a round cooking off after extended periods of continuous fire, since a cartridge is only momentarily introduced into the chamber prior to ignition, and the movement of the bolt and bolt carrier forces air through the chamber and barrel after each shot, ventilating the barrel and removing heat. Gas escaping the gas cylinder is directed upward, avoiding kicking up dust and debris that would reveal the shooter's position.

=== Features ===
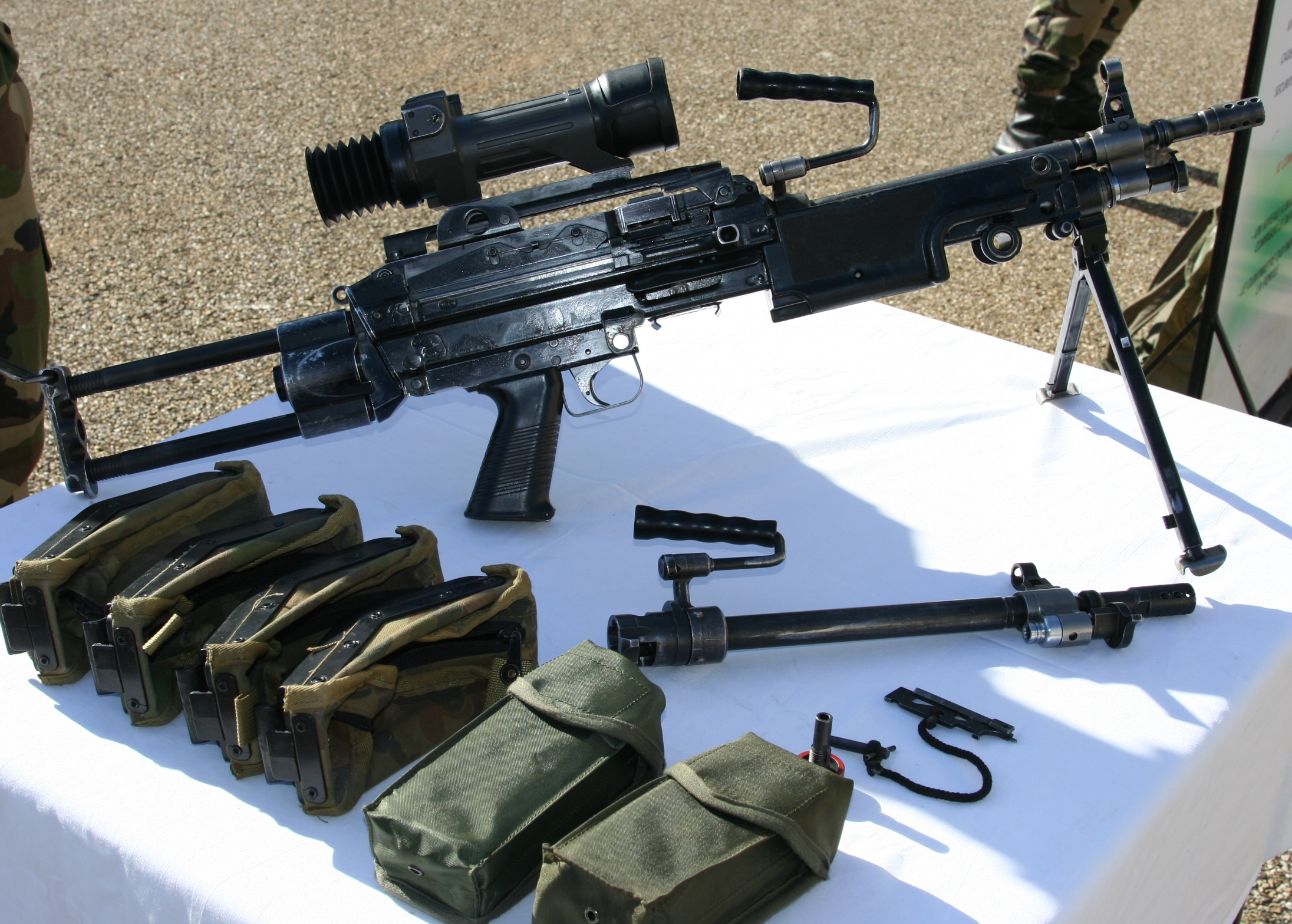
The Minimi Para with a telescopic sight, spare barrel and ammunition pouches.

The Minimi has a manually adjustable gas valve with two positions, normal and adverse. The adverse setting increases the cyclic rate of fire from 700 to 850 rounds per minute to 950–1,150 rounds per minute and is used only in extreme environmental conditions or when heavy fouling is present in the weapon's gas tube. The spring extractor is located inside the bolt, while the tilting lever ejector is contained inside the receiver housing. Spent casings are removed through a port located at the bottom of the right side of the receiver, protected from debris with a spring-loaded dust cover. The Minimi is striker-fired and the bolt carrier functions as the striker mechanism.

The Minimi has a push-button type manual safety installed in the trigger housing, above the pistol grip. In the "weapon safe" position, it disables the sear mechanism; pushing the button to the right side exposes a red-coloured rim on the left side of the firearm and indicates the weapon is ready to fire. The black polymer pistol grip from the FAL and FNC rifles was initially used, but the Minimi is currently fitted with a modified grip with lateral grooves, installed at a smaller angle to the receiver.

The Minimi features a welded receiver made from stamped steel. Both the standard and Para variants are equipped with a fixed, folding bipod mounted to the gas tube and stowed under the handguard. The bipod can be adjusted in height and each leg has three height settings. The bipod also offers a 15° range of rotation to either side. With the bipod fully extended, the bore axis is elevated to a height of 465 mm (18.3 in). The Minimi can also be fired from the Belgian FN360° tripod or the American M122 mount using an M60 pintle. The vehicle-mounted Minimi is fitted with an electrically powered trigger that enables it to be fired remotely from within an armoured fighting vehicle.

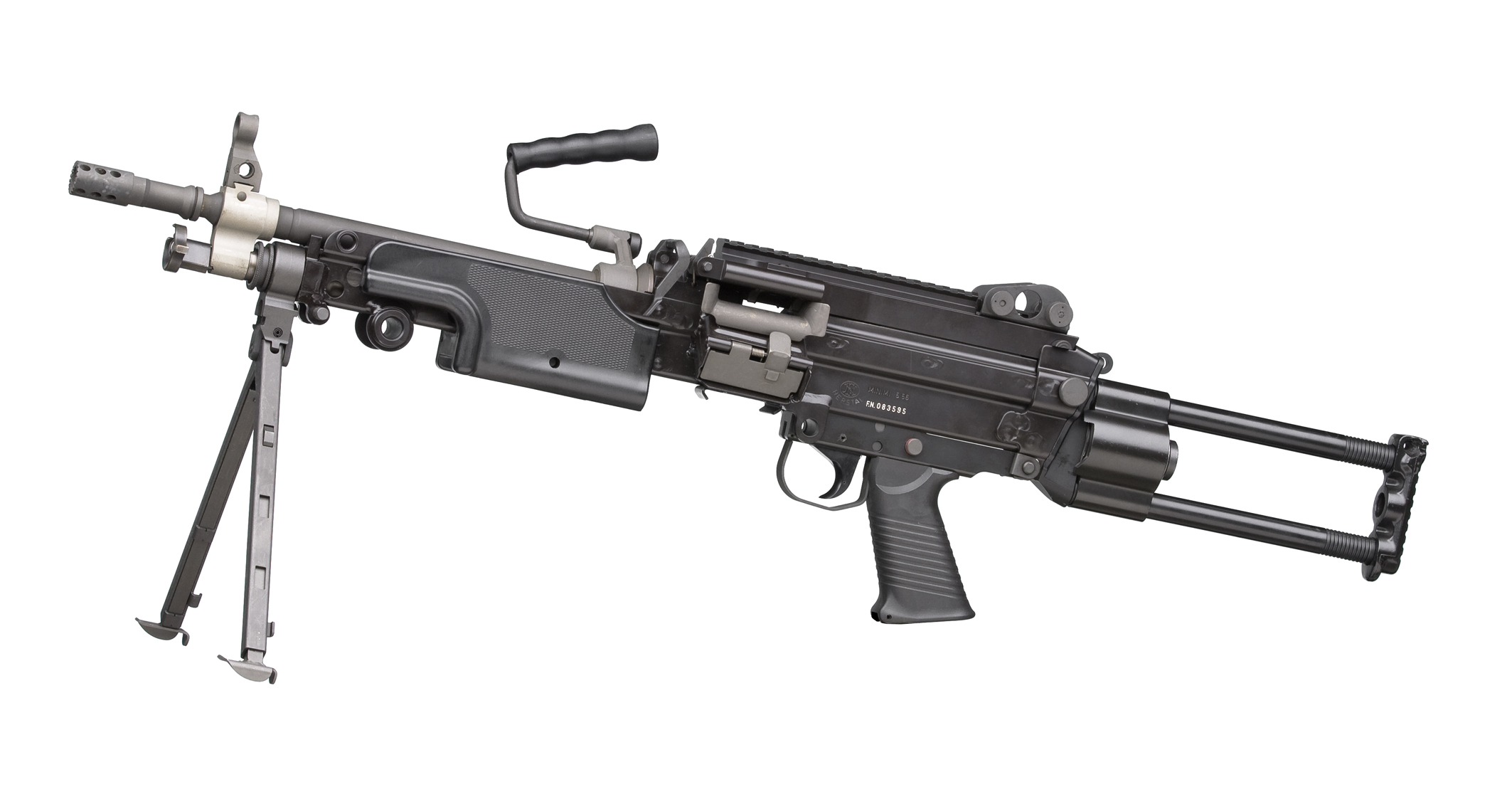
The short barrel Minimi Para

The standard light machine gun version has a 465 mm (18.3 in) barrel and a skeletonized aluminium stock with a folding wire shoulder strap. The shortened Para model has a 349 mm (13.7 in) barrel and a collapsible metal stock, while the vehicle-mounted model has a 465 mm (18.3 in) barrel but does not have a stock or iron sights. All models can alternatively be fitted with a fixed synthetic stock, the same used on the M249, which contains a hydraulic buffer that contributes to stabilizing the rate of fire and reducing recoil forces.

=== Feeding ===
Feeding schematic of the FN Minimi

The weapon is fed from the left-hand side by disintegrating-link M27 ammunition belts (a miniaturized version of the 7.62mm M13 belt), from either an unsupported loose belt, enclosed in a polymer ammunition box with a 200-round capacity attached to the base of the receiver, or from detachable STANAG magazines, used in other NATO 5.56 mm assault rifles such as the M16 and FNC. Magazine feeding is used only as an auxiliary measure, when belted ammunition has been exhausted. The ammunition belt is introduced into the feed tray, magazines are seated inside the magazine port at a 45° angle, located beneath the feed tray port. When a belt is placed in the feed tray it covers the magazine port. Likewise, a magazine inserted into the magazine well will prevent the simultaneous insertion of a belt. The magazine port, when not in use, is closed with an L-shaped hinged flap equipped with a tooth, which engages a corresponding opening in the magazine and serves as a magazine release. This feature was developed by FN's Maurice V. Bourlet and allows the Minimi to be instantly changed from belt feed to magazine feed without any modification.

The pawl-type feeding mechanism is modelled on the system used in the MAG general-purpose machine gun, which was originally used in the World War II-era MG 42. The belt is moved in two stages during both the forward and rearward movement of the reciprocating bolt carrier, which provides for a smooth and continuous feeding cycle. The feeding mechanism top cover features a device that indicates the presence of a cartridge in the feed path.

=== Barrel ===
The barrels used in the Minimi have an increased heat capacity for sustained fire, feature a chrome-lined rifled bore (six right-hand grooves) and are manufactured in two versions: with a 178 mm (1:7 in) twist rate used to stabilize the heavier Belgian 5.56×45mm SS109 projectile, or a 305 mm (1:12 in) twist for use with American M193 ammunition. The barrels have a quick-change capability; a lever is provided on the left side of the weapon that unlocks the barrel allowing the shooter to push it forward removing it from its trunnion. A carrying handle is also fixed to the barrel and assists in the barrel change process. A trained soldier can perform a barrel change and ready the weapon for aimed fire in 6 to 7 seconds. Early models of the Minimi had a flash suppressor with side ports as seen on the FN FAL, FN CAL, and FN FNC rifles; new production guns have a shorter, cone-shaped slotted flash suppressor.

=== Sights ===
Both the standard and Para models come with a rear sight, adjustable for windage and elevation, that provides a peep aperture for ranges from 300–1,000 m (980–3,280 ft), in 100 m (330 ft) increments. The sight line radius is 490 millimeters (19.3 in). The hooded front sight is installed in a post on the gas block and is also adjustable for elevation and windage. Early models of the Minimi had the rear sight mounted forward of the feed cover and the front post secured to the barrel, closer to the muzzle end. An adapter can also be used that allows the use of standard NATO night and day sights.

=== Accessories ===
Standard equipment supplied with the Minimi consists of three ammunition boxes, a cleaning kit stored inside the forearm, lubricant bottle, sling and blank-firing barrel.

== Variants ==
=== M249 ===
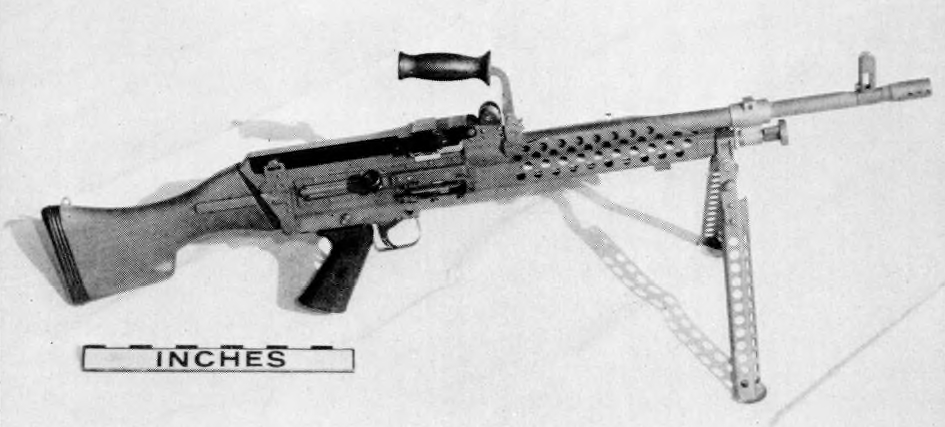
Initial Belgian-designed Minimi prototype delivered to the U.S. Infantry Board for evaluation, before it received its XM249 designation (note the difference)

The M249 version of the Minimi was adopted by the US military in 1982; since 1984, production for the US military has been carried out entirely in the US by a local subsidiary, FN Manufacturing LLC in South Carolina.

As part of the US military's M249 Product Improvement Program (PIP), the M249 was updated with: a new synthetic stock and modified buffer assembly, a single-position gas regulator, a so-called birdcage type flash hider/compensator from the M16A2, a polymer barrel heat guard, and a folding carry handle. As a result, the weapon's weight increased to 7.47 kg (16.5 lb). Many of the PIP upgrades were later incorporated by FN for the Minimi.

A lightweight variant of the Para with a Picatinny top cover rail adapter is known as the Minimi Special Purpose Weapon (SPW). It had the magazine feed port removed to further reduce weight, and a railed MIL-STD-1913 handguard was used that enables the use of standard tactical accessories.

Another variant of the SPW requested by the US Special Operations Forces is the Mk 46 Mod 0 that incorporates a lightweight fluted barrel but lacks the magazine feed system, vehicle mounting lugs and carry handle. A railed forearm ensures modularity and mission-adaptability permitting the use of flashlights, vertical grips, and infrared laser designators. An improved variant known as the Mk 46 Mod 1 with an improved forward rail and lightweight titanium bipod has been adopted by the United States Navy.

=== Minimi 7.62 ===
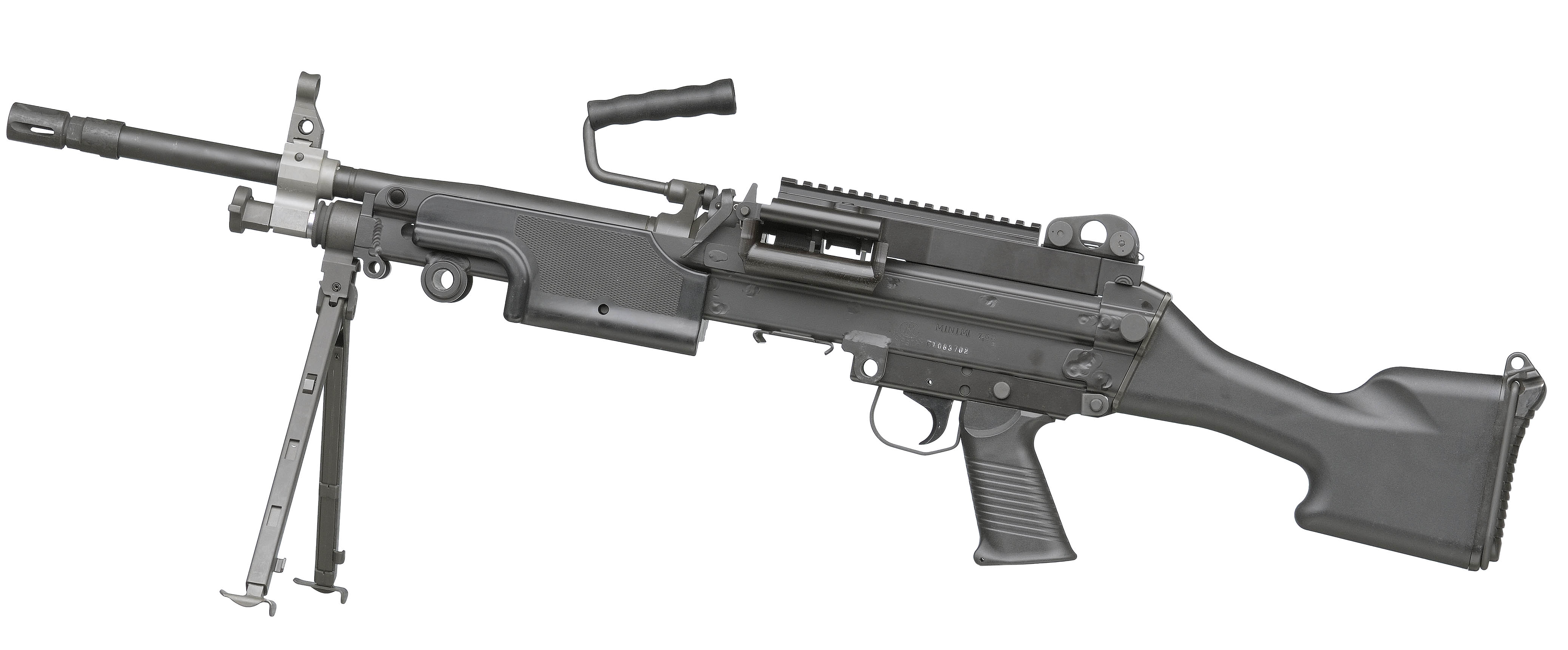
Minimi 7.62

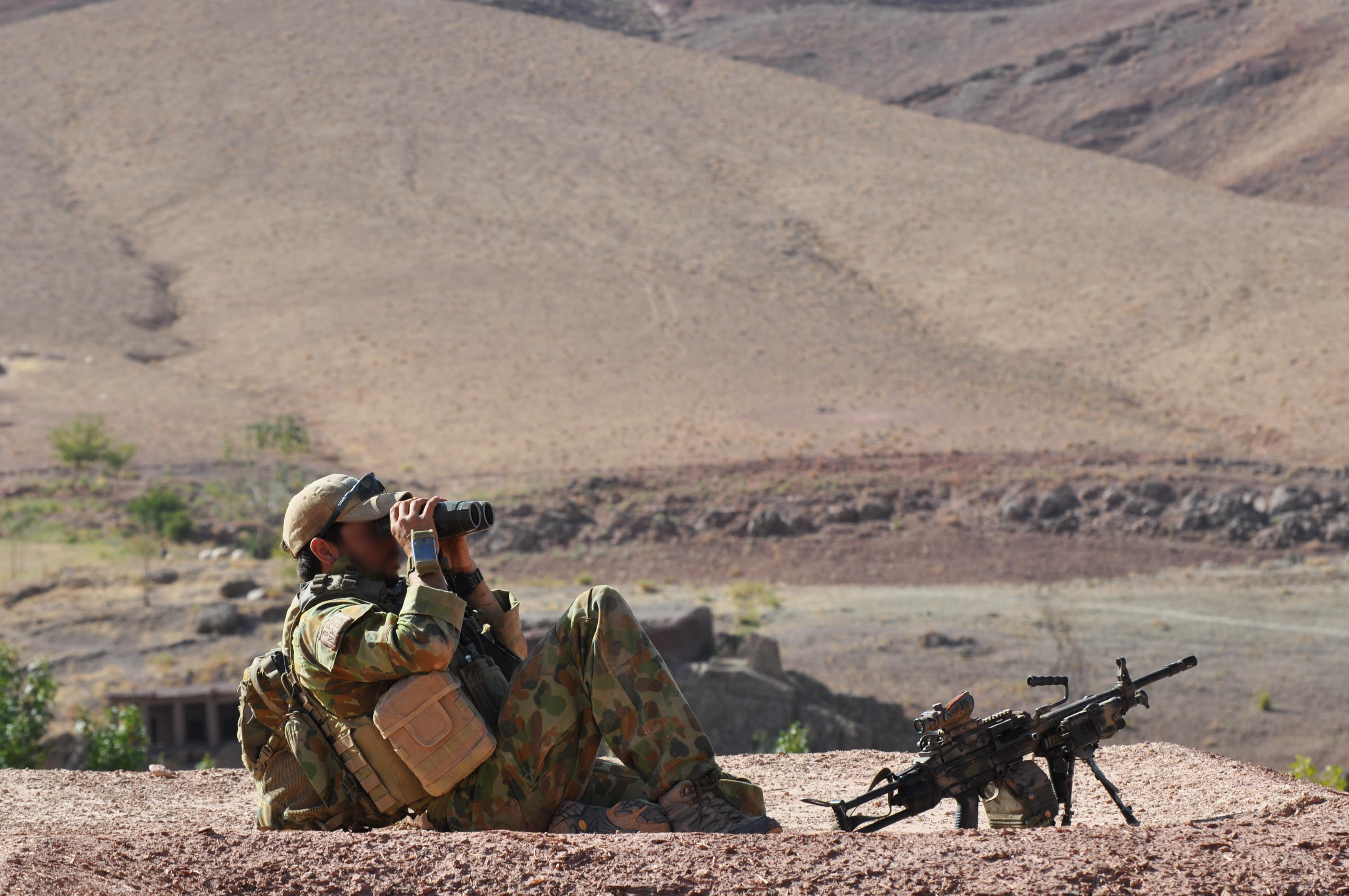
Australian special forces soldier with a Minimi 7.62 TR Sliding Butt in Afghanistan, 2009

The Minimi prototype was originally designed in 7.62×51mm NATO, and later redesigned for the 5.56 mm cartridge.

When the USSOCOM issued the requirements for the Mk 48 Mod 0 in the early 2000s, the original plans for the Minimi were retrieved and used to develop this new model. As a result of favourable reviews of the Mk 48 Mod 0 and increasing demand for a more powerful variant of the Minimi, FN Herstal introduced the Minimi 7.62. In November 2006, a FN Herstal press release said the Minimi 7.62 had recently been "launched onto the market" and was available "with a fixed or telescopic buttstock and a standard or triple rail handguard".

Apart from the different caliber, the Minimi 7.62 incorporates a non-adjustable, self-regulating gas system and a hydraulic recoil buffer in the buttstock assembly.

The Minimi 7.62 also has a different sight setup calibrated for the larger cartridge. The rear sight is adjustable from 300–1,000 m (980–3,280 ft), in 100 m (330 ft) increments. The sight can also be corrected for windage. The Minimi 7.62 TR is a variant equipped with a Picatinny rail handguard from the factory.

In Australian service, the Minimi 7.62 is known as the "Maximi".

=== Minimi Mk3 ===
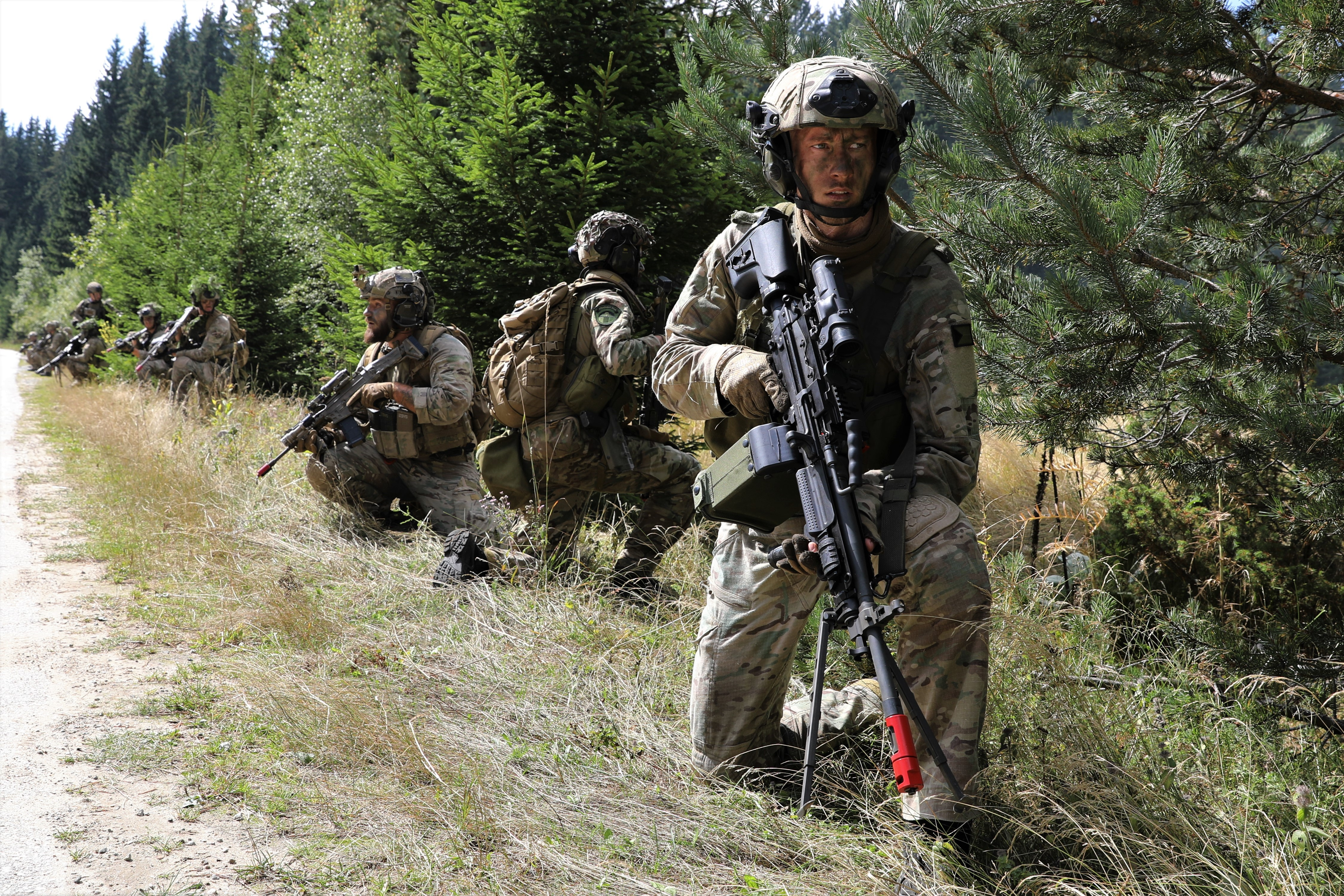
Czech 43rd Airborne Regiment paratrooper with a FN MINIMI 7.62 Mk3 (right)

In November 2013, FN Herstal unveiled the Mk3 version of the Minimi light machine gun the Minimi 5.56 Mk3 and the Minimi 7.62 Mk3. The Mk3 upgrades were based on operational experience and user feedback over the past 10 to 15 years.

The stock is 5-position adjustable that is also adjustable for cheek rest height with a folding shoulder rest and hydraulic buffer. The feed tray has retaining pawls to hold ammunition from the belt in place while loading. The handguard has three forward picatinny rails. A new bipod is 3-position height adjustable and seamlessly integrates into the shape of the handguard when folded back regardless of accessories that may be attached. Others features include a more ergonomic cocking handle and an optional heat shield, enabled by an added on long pin, to protect from barrel heat. The Minimi 7.62 Mk3 can be converted to fire 5.56×45mm rounds.

Users that already have Minimi machine guns can partially or completely upgrade their existing weapons with the Mk3 features.

=== Production in other countries ===
==== License-built versions ====
Country	Manufacturer	Model	References
Canada	Colt Canada (Note: Originally made by FN. Upgrades over time done by Diemaco prior to company being bought and renamed.)	C9	
Australia	Lithgow Arms	F89	
Italy	Beretta	Mitragliatrice Minimi cal. 5,56 mm NATO	
Indonesia	Pindad	Pindad SM-3	
Japan	Sumitomo Heavy Industries	5.56mm 機関銃 MINIMI	
Sweden	Bofors Carl Gustaf	Ksp 90	
Greece	Hellenic Defence Systems	5.56mm Minimi	

===== Canadian variants =====
====== C9 LMG ======
Standard factory FN Minimi with a steel tubular buttstock.

====== C9A1 ======
The C9A1 comes fitted with a Picatinny rail on the feed cover mounting a 3.4× ELCAN C79 telescopic sight and can mount a vertical grip on the underside of the stock for added stability in prone firing.

====== C9A2 ======
The C9A2 mid-life upgrade introduced a second barrel which was shorter (both with an upgraded muzzle device), reduced IR green furniture, a C8-style collapsible stock, folding vertical foregrip and a laser aiming module (LAM) C9-specific TRIAD.

===== Swedish variants =====
====== Ksp 90 ======
Standard factory FN Minimi with a steel tubular buttstock, also known as the "Machine gun 90" (Swedish: Kulspruta 90).

====== Ksp 90B ======
Para model of the Ksp 90.

===== Indonesian variant =====
====== SM3 ======
Standard factory FN Minimi with a steel tubular buttstock, the distinguishing feature of this machine gun is that it cannot use STANAG magazines.

====== SM3-A1 ======
The SM-3 A1 fitted with an AR-style collapsible stock and Picatinny rail on the feed cover. Additionally, for long-range shooting, a “direct sight scope” (scope) may be mounted.

===== Japanese variant =====
====== 5.56mm機関銃MINIMI ======
The Japan Self-Defense Forces (JSDF) adopted the locally produced Minimi under the name "5.56mm Machine Gun MINIMI" (Japanese: 5.56mm機関銃MINIMI) since the 1993 fiscal year as a successor to the Type 62 7.62mm machine gun until 2019.

The license-produced MINIMI can be equipped with the Type 62 GPMG tripod using a special attachment, and is used when precise shooting is required. Additionally, for long-range shooting, a “direct sight scope” (scope) may be mounted. The model adopted by the JSDF is the so-called standard type with a metal tube stock, and it has unique modifications such as a different shape for the barrel change lever. The side of the gun body is marked with 5.56mm Machine Gun MINIMI.

A distinctive feature is the unique heat cover (upper sleeve) mounted on the top of the barrel. This cover, similar to the M249 used by US Military, is an added component that became equipped after adoption. However, the number of cooling vents in the central column has been reduced from 8 (on the original version) to 7, indicating a shape difference. The magazine stop for STANAG magazines is not used because it prevents training with blank rounds.

On December 18, 2013, the Ministry of Defense announced that Sumitomo Heavy Industries had falsified inspection data over several decades and had delivered machine guns that did not meet the required performance standards. As a result, the company was placed under a 5-month suspension of designation. It is reported that at least 5,350 units, including 12.7mm heavy machine guns, 7.62mm machine guns, and 5.56mm machine guns, were delivered since 1979. Even before the data falsification was discovered, personnel in the field had recognized that the Minimi produced by Sumitomo Heavy Industries was of low performance.

In April 2021, Sumitomo Heavy Industries announced its withdrawal from the production of machine guns and the development of 5.56mm machine guns due to budget constraints and reduced order volumes. However, the company stated it would continue producing parts for maintenance and repair.

Due to the obsolescence of the Minimi Mk1 and the cessation of procurement, the JGSDF conducted a selection for its next machine gun. The JGSDF decided to continue using the 5.56mm caliber and chose the MINIMI Mk3 over Germany's Heckler & Koch MG4. The “5.56mm Machine Gun MINIMI(B)” is being procured not through domestic production, but via imports. The procurement plan includes 3,100 units of MINIMI(B), which will replace the existing Minimi Mk1 over time.

===== Australian variant =====
====== F89 ======
Both the Standard and Para versions are used, with the Standard version usually being equipped with a 1.5x sight, and the Para variant usually equipped with a holographic sight, a removable forward grip and a detachable bipod. In 1994, tests were conducted on using different flash suppressors on F89s to increase accuracy.

==== Unlicensed copies ====
Country	Manufacturer	Model	References
China	Chongqing Changfeng Machine Factory	CS/LM8	
China	Yunnan Xiyi Industry Company Limited	XY 5.56	
Taiwan	Armaments Bureau	T75	
Turkey	Kale Group	KMG-556	
UAE	Caracal International	CLMG 556	

== Users ==
Map of FN Minimi operators

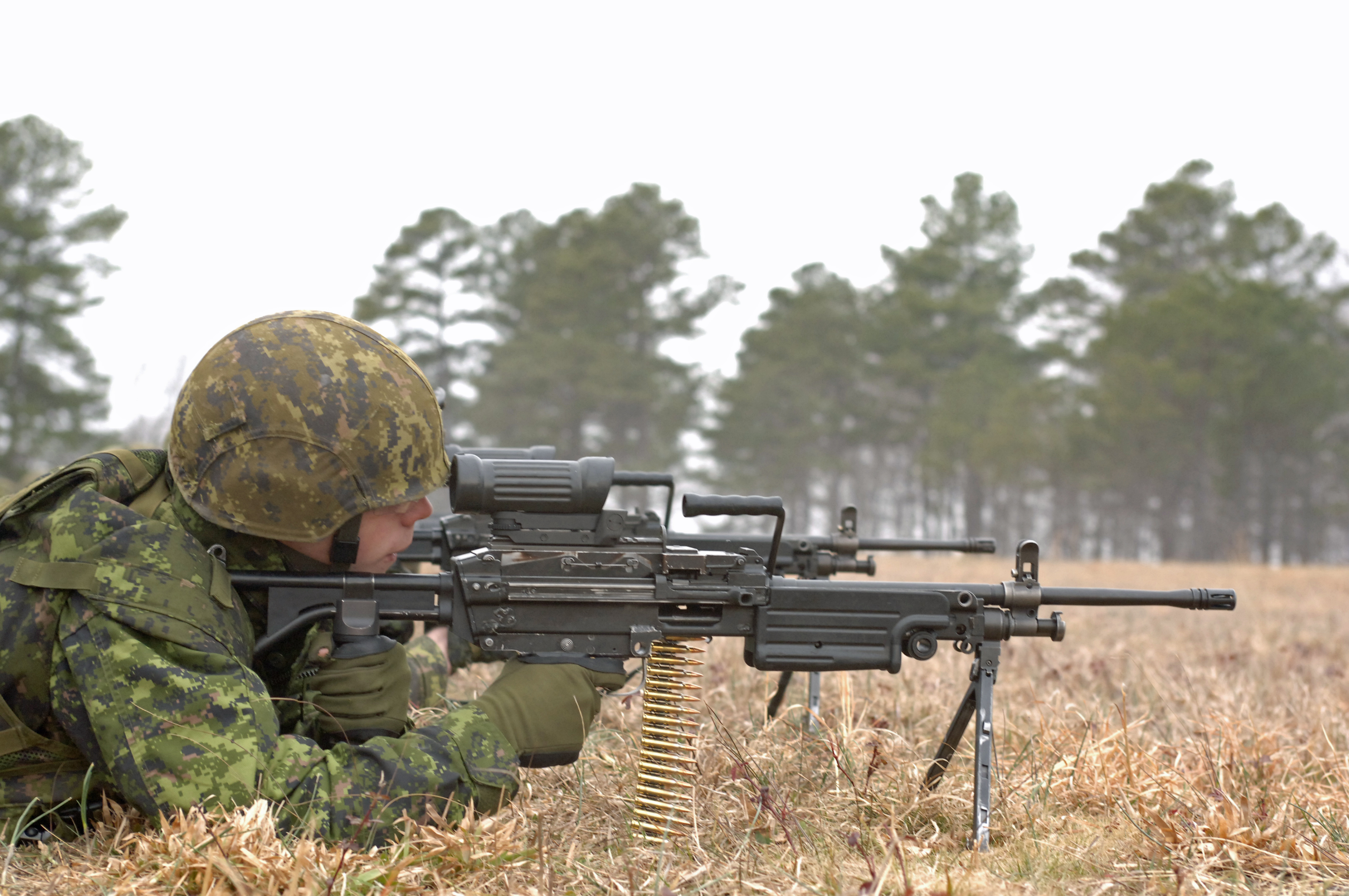
Canadian soldier training with the C9A1. The C9A1 is a Belgian-made Minimi Standard equipped with a 3.4× C79 optical sight.

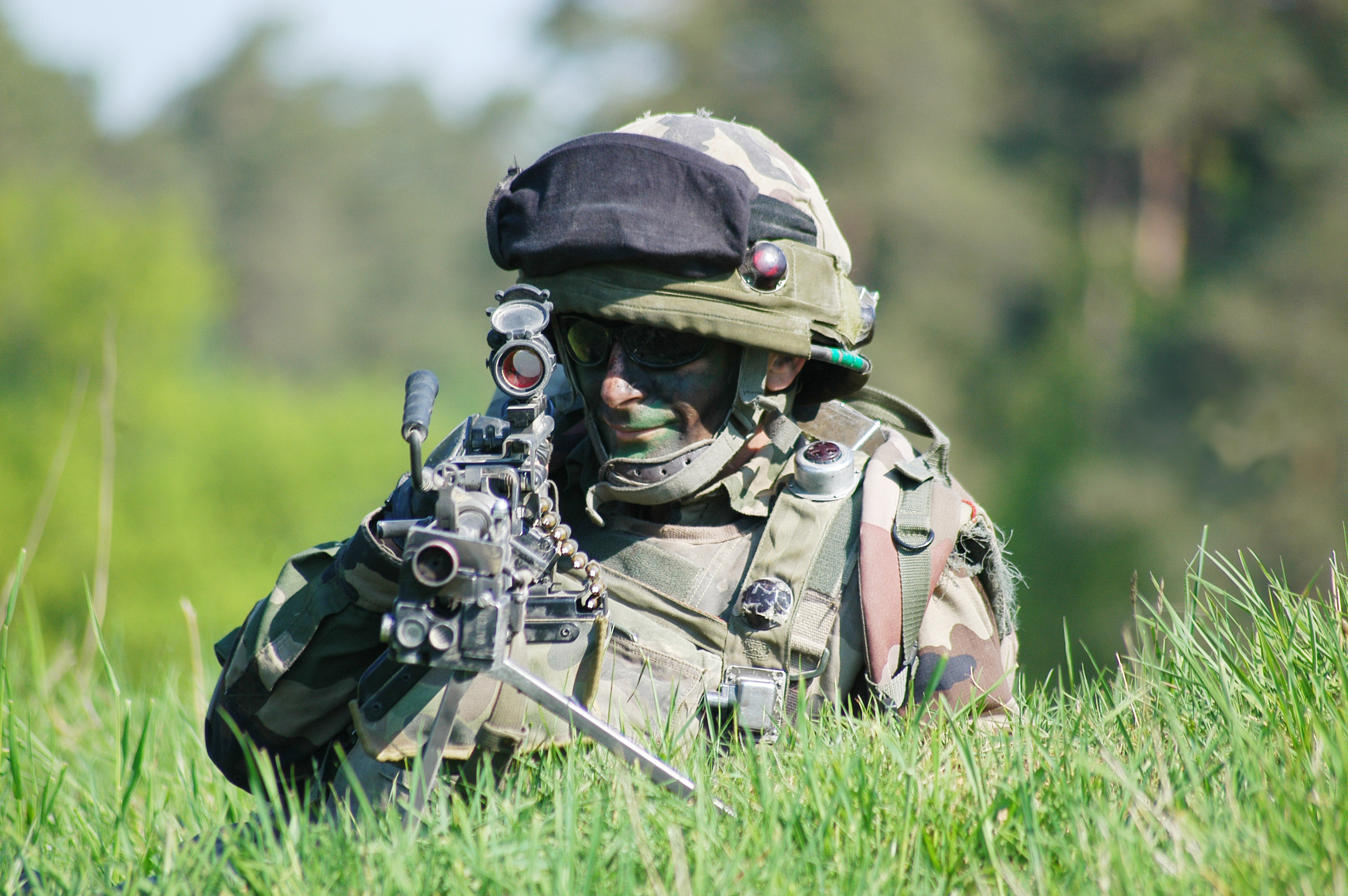
A Minimi Para gunner of the French Army

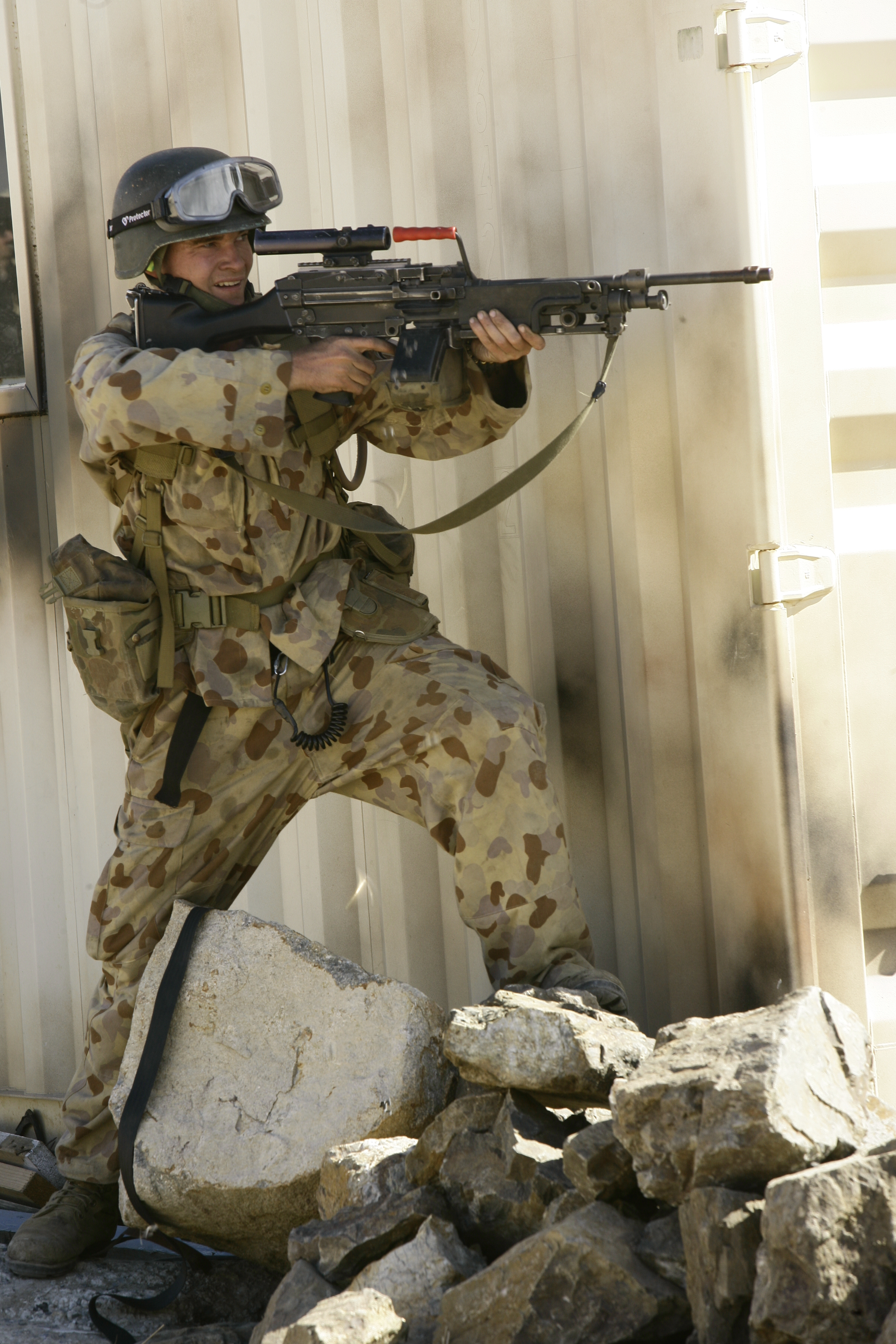
An Australian F89A1 Minimi. Fitted is a blank-firing barrel and the standard issue 1.5× power scope common with the F88 assault rifle

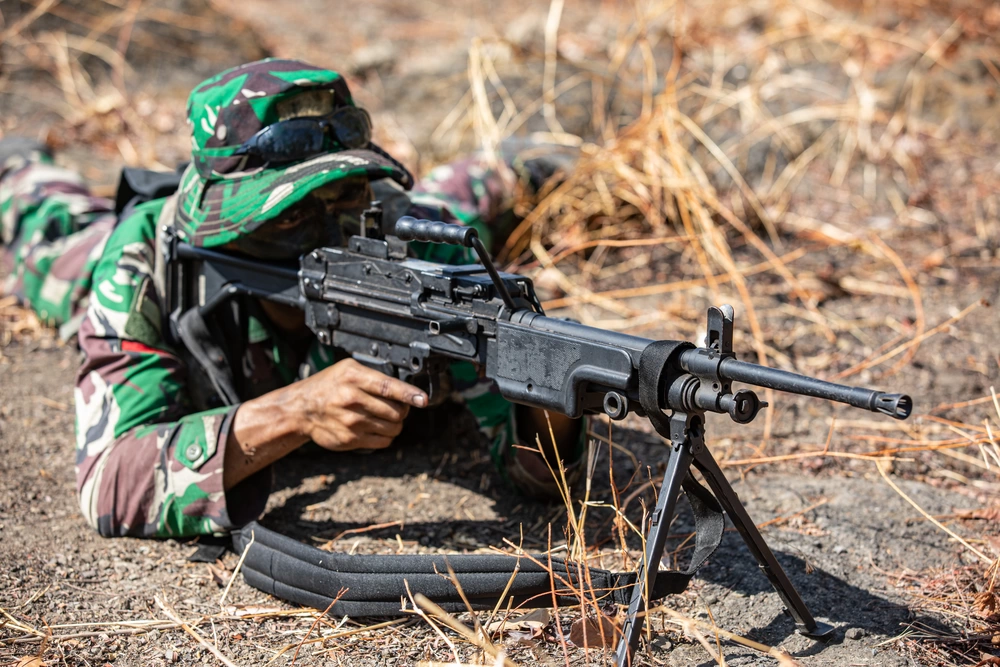
An Indonesian soldier with Pindad SM3, a licensed-made of Minimi.

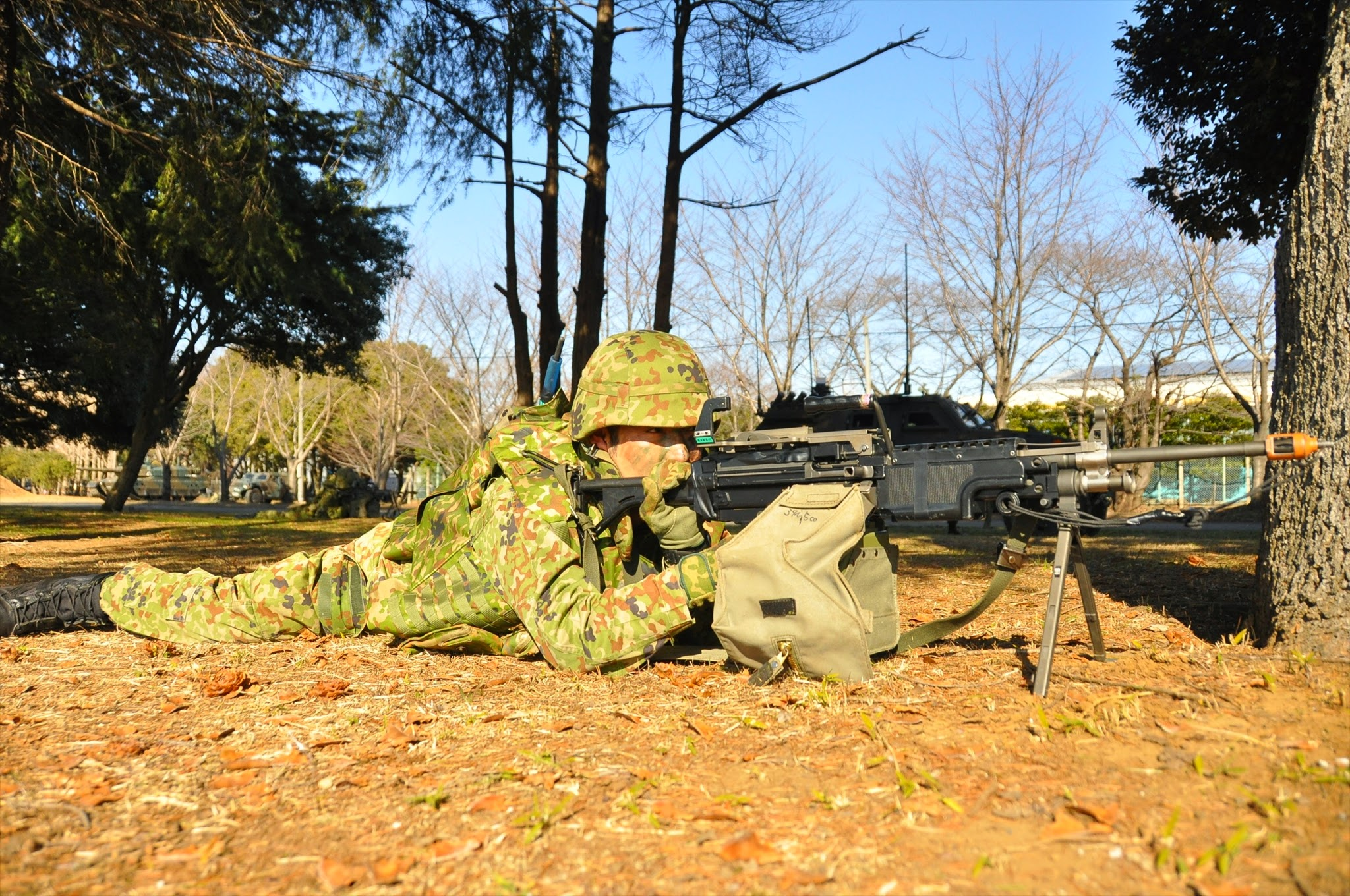
A JGSDF soldier with a Sumitomo Minimi. Fitted is a blank-firing barrel.

The Minimi has been adopted by over 45 countries.

- Argentina: M249 variant in use.
- Australia: Designated F89 in Australian service. It is manufactured by Lithgow Arms. The Maximi was issued in 2011 after being trialled in Afghanistan and is in limited service.
- Azerbaijan:
- Belgium: Standard infantry support weapon of the Belgian Army. Uses both the standard (called the Minimi Mk2) and Para (Minimi Mk3) models.
- Brazil: Used by the Batalhão de Operações Policiais Especiais (BOPE) from Military Police of Rio de Janeiro, Coordenadoria de Recursos Especiais from the Civil Police of Rio de Janeiro, Federal police GPI, as well by the Brazilian Army, Marine Corps (399 by 17 military organization, with 13 adopting the Minimi 5,56 Standard and 4 adopting the Minimi 5,56 Para) and Brazilian Air Force. The Army Special Forces uses 38 Minimi 5,56 Special Purpose Weapon (SPW).
- Burundi: Burundian rebels.
- Canada: The C9 LMG was adopted in the 1980s.
- Chile: Used by Chilean Army.
- China: Locally-made clones are used by Chinese police.
- Colombia: Used by Colombian military (M249 and MK3).
- Croatia:
- Cyprus: Used by the Cypriot National Guard.
- Czech Republic: 7.62×51mm NATO Minimi adopted as the standard machine-gun for the Czech Army replacing the Uk vz. 59. 317 delivered as of January 2016. The 601st Special Forces Group uses the Mk 48 Mod 0. 5.56mm M249 variant were also in use.
- Denmark: Used by the Jægerkorps.
- East Timor: Timor Leste Defence Force
- France: The Para version is widely used by the French Army. Fielded alongside the FN MAG GPMG.
- Greece: Used by the Hellenic Army.
- Hungary: M249 SAW is used by the Hungarian Special Force.
- Indonesia: Standard light machine gun of Indonesian Armed Forces. The SM3 was used from 2007.
- Iraq
- Ireland: Para in use with the Army Ranger Wing (ARW) special forces.
- Italy: The Minimi is made under license by Beretta, which has a partnership with FN, and is employed by the Italian Armed Forces, replacing the MG 42/59 (a variant of the WWII MG 42, which still sees widespread mounted use) in the squad automatic weapon role. The Minimi is being widely employed by Italian forces in all the most recent and current international theaters of operation.
- Japan: Partially replaced the NTK-62 with the Japanese Ground Self-Defense Forces. It is manufactured under license by Sumitomo Heavy Industries. The JGSDF is making plans to replace them, but SHI has confirmed that it will not be involved in a potential LMG tender. In January 2023, the FN-made Minimi MK3 was selected and designed as MINIMI(B). Around 3,100 Mk3s are set to be imported.
- Kuwait
- Latvia: Standard light machine gun in Latvian inventory.
- Lebanon
- Libya
- Lithuania: 7.62×51mm FN Minimi MK 3.
- Luxembourg: The Luxembourgish Army uses it as a Squad automatic Weapon. The Para variant is used by the Unité Spéciale de la Police intervention unit of the Grand Ducal Police.
- Malaysia: The Malaysian Army replace the HK11A1 machine gun with the Minimi. Also used by police special force units.
- Mexico: Mexican Air Force uses it on helicopters.
- Nepal: Purchased 5,500 units in 2002.
- Netherlands: The Royal Netherlands Army has brought in the Para version of the Minimi to replace the FN MAG in some infantry roles. The Dutch Korps Commandotroepen use the Minimi 5.56 para version. The MAG is still being used as a general-purpose machine gun, support fire weapon and as a vehicle-mounted weapon.
- New Zealand: The New Zealand Defence Force uses the Minimi under the designation C9 Minimi. This gun has been used as the Army's Light Support Weapon (LSW) since 1988. The 7.62 Minimi TR was selected in Feb 2012 to replace the C9 LSW Minimi and will be known as the 7.62 LSW Minimi in NZDF service.
- Norway: Para version in use with HJK/FSK, and MJK since the late 1980s, since 2011 in use with armed forces of Norway (1,900 machine guns were purchased in 2011). In September 2021 FN Herstal and Norwegian Defence Materiel Agency signed a framework agreement for delivery of 4000 Minimi 7,62 Mk3.
- Pakistan: SSG, SSW, SSGN.
- Papua New Guinea: Designated F89.
- Peru: Used by the Infantería de Marina del Perú (Peruvian Naval Infantry).
- Philippines: In use by the Armed Forces of the Philippines (AFP). Purchased the FN Minimi in May 2002 with 402 acquired. Additional order cancelled in favor of rebidding due to corruption allegations during Arroyo Administration.
- Poland: JW GROM
- Portugal: Portuguese Army received in 2019 Minimi MK3 machine guns in the 5.56×45mm and 7.62×51mm calibers. In 2022 Portuguese Marine Corps received an unknown amount of 5.56×45mm Minimi MK3.
- Serbia: Used by the special forces units of the Armed Forces (72nd Brigade for Special Operations and 63rd Parachute Brigade) and Special Anti-Terrorist Unit of the Police.
- Senegal: Used by Senegalese special forces units.
- Slovenia: Minimi Para used by the Military of Slovenia.
- Spain: The Spanish Navy acquired Minimi light machine guns in the 5.56×45mm Para and 7.62×51mm versions.
- Sri Lanka
- Syria: Syrian Arab Army, formerly Desert Hawks Brigade.
- Sweden: Known as the Ksp 90 (Kulspruta 90). Para model designated Ksp 90B; both are made by Bofors Carl Gustaf.
- Switzerland: Designated LMg 05 (Leichtes Maschinengewehr 05) or FM 05 (Fusil mitrailleur 05).
- Taiwan: Used by the Republic of China Army; a version re-engineered for local production, designated T75, is in use by the Republic of China Marine Corps.
- Thailand: Used by the Royal Thai Navy Marine Corps and by the Royal Thai Army (M249 variant).
- Tunisia
- Turkey: Used by General Directorate of Security and Turkish Land Forces. Also CS/LM8s purchased from China as replacement of older FN Minimi MK 1s used by Police Special Operation Department.
- Ukraine: Received from Canada and Belgium in 2022 and used during the Russo-Ukrainian War. 300 Minimi Mk3 in 7.62×51mm were also donated to the AFU by Come Back Alive Foundation in 2024 and 2025.
- United Arab Emirates
- United Kingdom: Used standard and Para variants, designated L108A1 and the L110A2 respectively. The Army equipped each four-man fireteam with the Para variant. The LMG was usually fitted with the 4× SUSAT standard-issue rifle sight. It was also used by the Royal Navy, Royal Marines Commandos and the RAF Regiment. Some 7.62 Minimis are in service. The L110A3 was phased out by early 2019 in favour of the earlier L7A2 general purpose machine gun, Joint Force Command users retained their stocks of the weapon.
- United States: United States Armed Forces use it designated as the M249 light machine gun.
- Yemen: FN Minimi reported by Amnesty to be used by a militia during the Hodeidah offensive in 2018

=== Former users ===
- Afghanistan: The Afghan National Army made use of U.S.-supplied M249s during the Taliban insurgency.

=== Non-state users ===
- Free Aceh Movement
- Mali: People's Movement for the Liberation of Azawad
- Taliban: Former Afghan government stocks. 59 ex-British Minimis were also used by the Taliban during the War in Afghanistan.

== Bibliography ==
- Jones, Richard D.; Ness, Leland S., eds. (2010). Jane's Infantry Weapons 2010-2011. Jane's Publishing. ISBN 978-0710629081.
- McNab, Chris (23 February 2017). The FN Minimi Light Machine Gun: M249, L108A1, L110A2, and other variants. Weapon 53. Osprey Publishing. ISBN 978-1-4728-1621-4.
- Popenker, Maxim; Williams, Anthony G. (2008). Machine Gun. The Development of the Machine Gun from the Nineteenth Century to the Present Day. London: Crowood Press. ISBN 978-1-84797-030-5.
