= T75 light machine gun =

T75 Squad Machine Gun
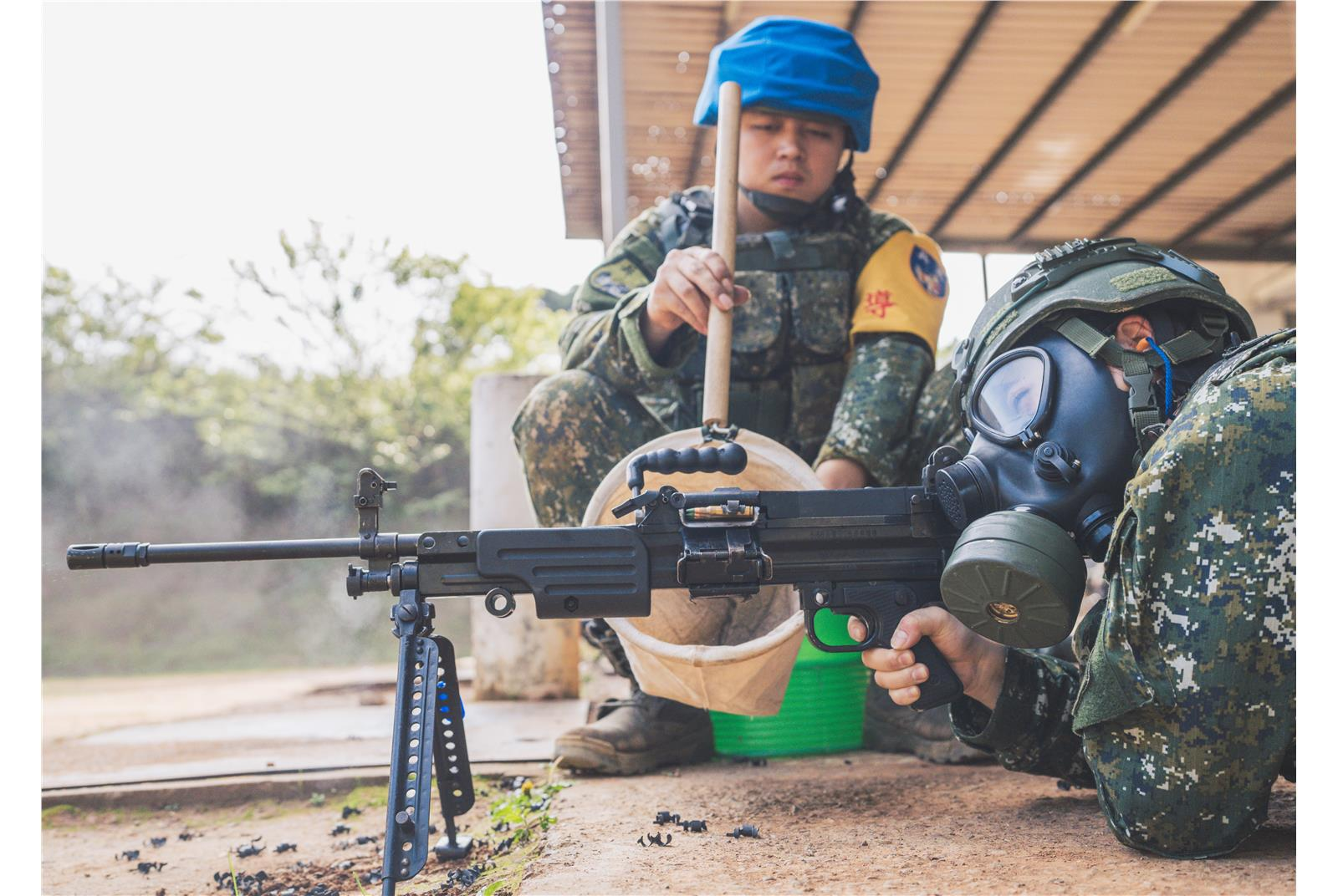
- Type: Light machine gun
- Place of origin: Taiwan

Service history
- In service: 1992–present

Production history
- Designer: 205th Armory
- Designed: 1983-1985
- Manufacturer: 205th Armory
- Produced: 1987-

Specifications
- Mass: 7.5 kg
- Length: 1110 mm
- Cartridge: 5.56×45 mm NATO
- Caliber: 5.56 mm (.223 in)
- Action: gas-operated
- Rate of fire: 600-900 rounds/min
- Muzzle velocity: 900–950 m/s
- Effective firing range: 800 m
- Feed system: 200-round disintegrating belts; 30-round STANAG magazines

The T75 Light machine gun (Chinese: T75班用機槍; lit. 'T75 squad machine gun') is produced by the 205th Arsenal, Ministry of Defense, Republic of China (Taiwan).

== History ==
The T75 project was initiated to upgrade the Taiwanese light machine gun inventory by replacing the T57, the locally produced M60 machine gun variant and to a lesser extent, the M1919 Browning. It was also an effort to lessen reliance on foreign weapons amid the increasing military requirement. It was formerly known as the T65K2 when the project started.

The T75 was designed between 1983 and 1985, before commencing production in 1987. The T75 entered service in 1992 and is currently the standard issue LMG of the Republic of China Armed Forces.

== Operational Use ==
Aside from providing supportive fire on squad level, the T75 is deployed aboard Republic of China Navy and Coast Guard Administration vessels.

== Design ==
The T75 is based on the proven Belgian-made FN Minimi incorporating features from the T57 and T74 machine-guns with more modern features. The T75 is slightly heavier but shorter and more compact than the Minimi. While its external appearance resembles the Minimi, the T75 uses a M60-type bipod which is one of its key characteristics.

To facilitate logistical maintenance, around 60% of T75's parts are compatible with the T74 GPMG, the Taiwanese FN MAG variant.

Like the Minimi, the T75 may be fed by 200-round disintegrating belts, 30-round STANAG magazines, T65 assault rifle magazines, and drum magazines. Aside from the standard 5.56x45 mm NATO around, the T75 can also fire Taiwanese-made TC74 armour piercing rounds and TC79 tracer rounds.

== Variant ==
=== T75 SFAW ===
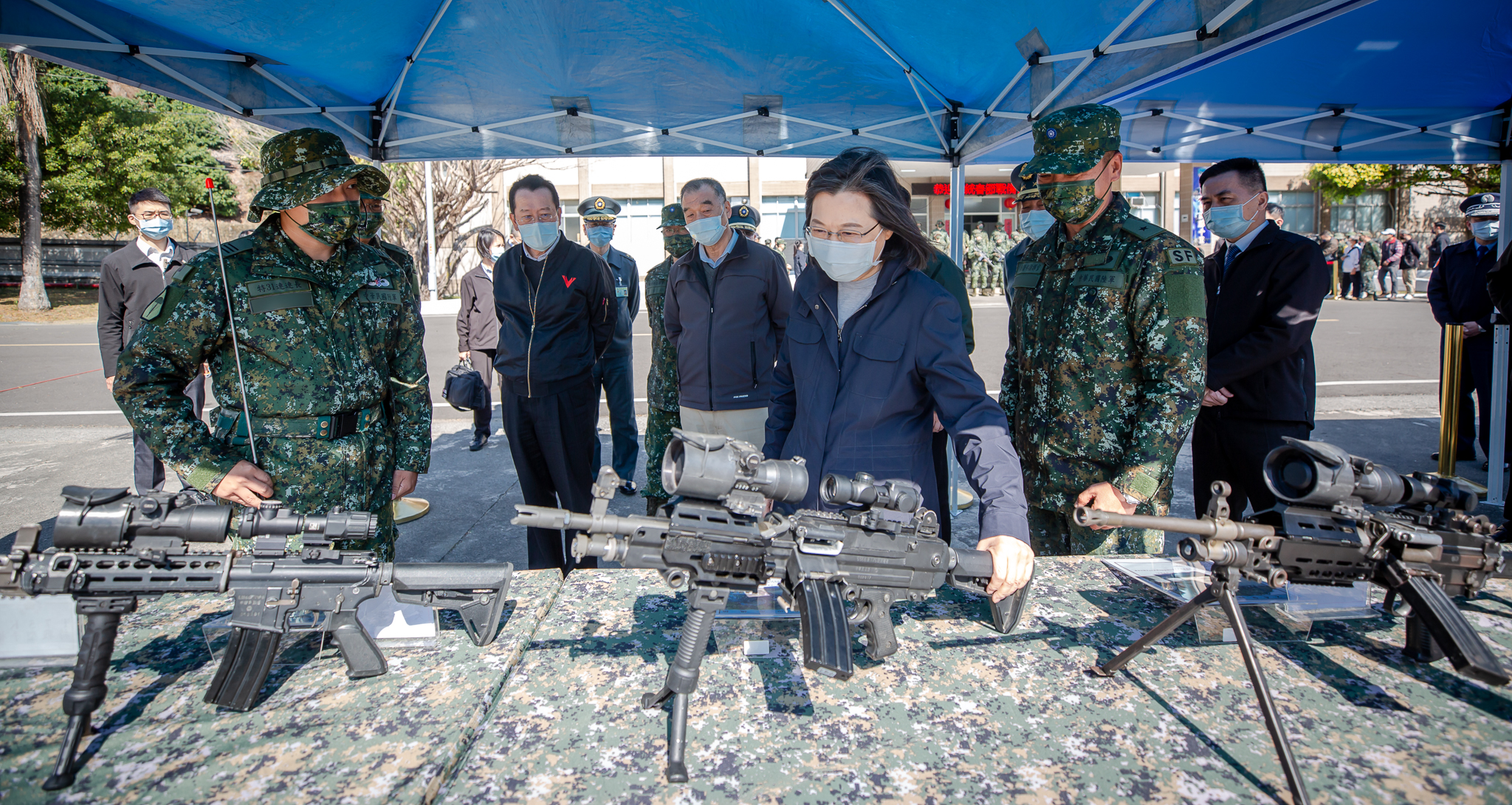
The T-75 SFAW displayed at the Army Special Forces Command 3rd Battalion when then President Tsai Ing-wen encouraged the officers and soldiers of the battalion.

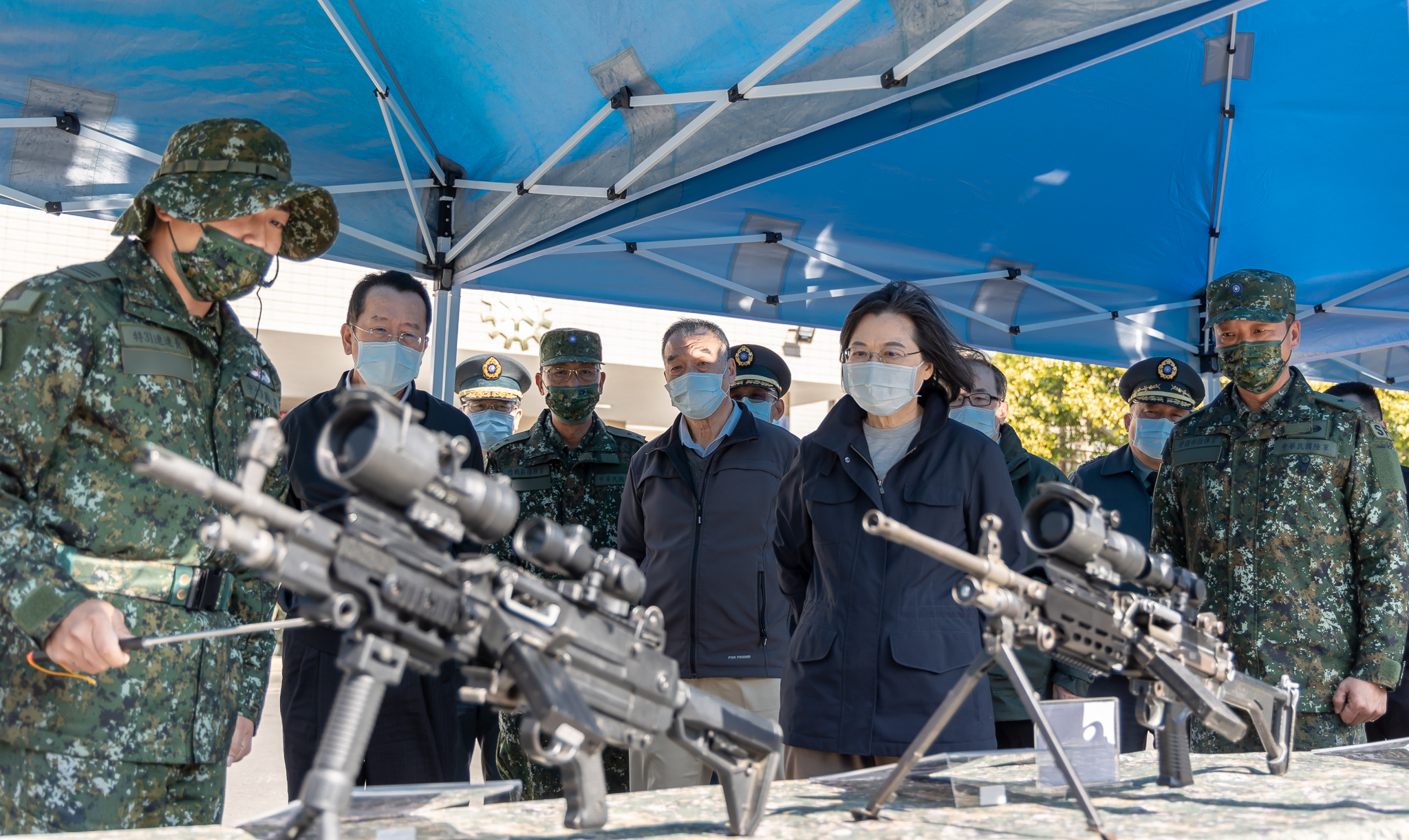
T-75 SFAW

The T75 SFAW is a T75 variant modified and optimised for special forces operatives. It is equipped with a shorter barrel assembly and a folding stock, which makes the LMG more compact. 30 models have since been produced.

== Users ==
- Republic of China: Republic of China Armed Forces

== Bibliography ==
- Jones, Richard D.; Ness, Leland S., eds. (2010). Jane's Infantry Weapons 2010-2011. Jane's Publishing. ISBN 978-0710629081.
