= Topy Industries =

Japanese manufacturer of steel products

Topy Industries, Ltd.

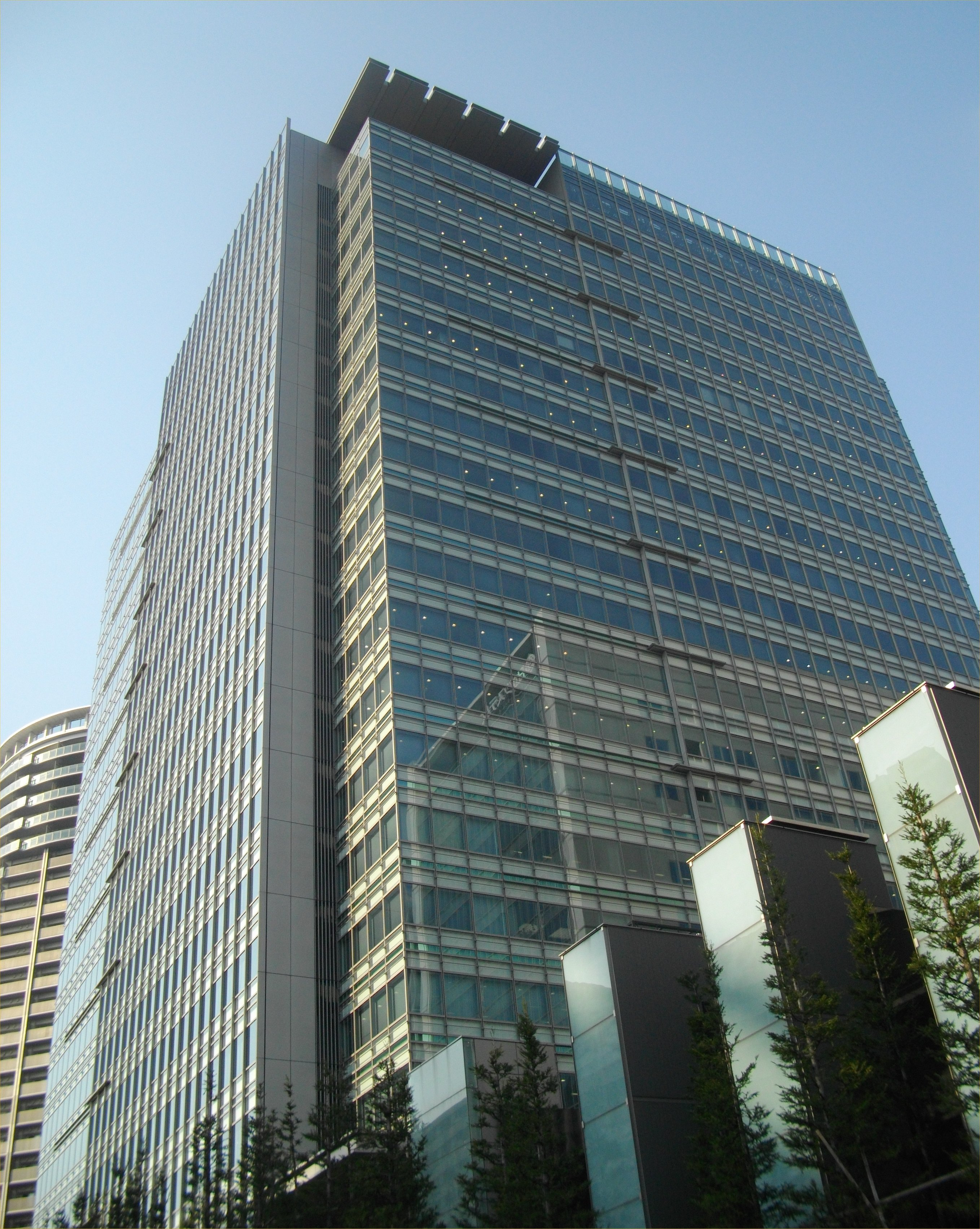
- Topy Industries headquarters building in Tokyo
- Native name: トピー工業株式会社
- Company type: Public
- Traded as: TYO: 7231
- ISIN: JP3630200008
- Industry: Machinery; Automotive
- Founded: October 1921; 104 years ago
- Headquarters: Art Village Osaki Central Tower Osaki, Shinagawa-ku, Tokyo, 141-8634, Japan
- Area served: Worldwide
- Key people: Yasuo Fujii (chairman of the board); Nobuhiko Takamatsu; (president and CEO)
- Products: Steel products; Automotive and construction machinery components; Crawler robots
- Revenue: ▼JPY 208 billion (FY 2016) (US$ 1.9 billion) (FY 2016)
- Net income: ▲JPY 7.1 billion (FY 2016) (US$ 66 million) (FY 2016)
- Number of employees: 4,568 (consolidated, as of March 31, 2017)
- Parent: Nippon Steel
- Website: Official website

Topy Industries, Ltd. (トピー工業株式会社, Topī Kōgyō Kabushiki-gaisha) is a Japanese company specializing in steel, particularly automobile and industrial components. Its main products are steel products; wheels for passenger cars, buses, trucks and construction machinery; and undercarriage components for construction equipment.

The company has production sites in Japan, US, China, Mexico and Thailand and is an OEM wheel supplier to a number of car manufacturers such as Honda, Nissan, Ford, General Motors, Subaru, Kia and Chrysler. In the past Topy Industries was part of the Fuyo Group keiretsu.
