= ThinkPark Tower =

- シンクパークタワー
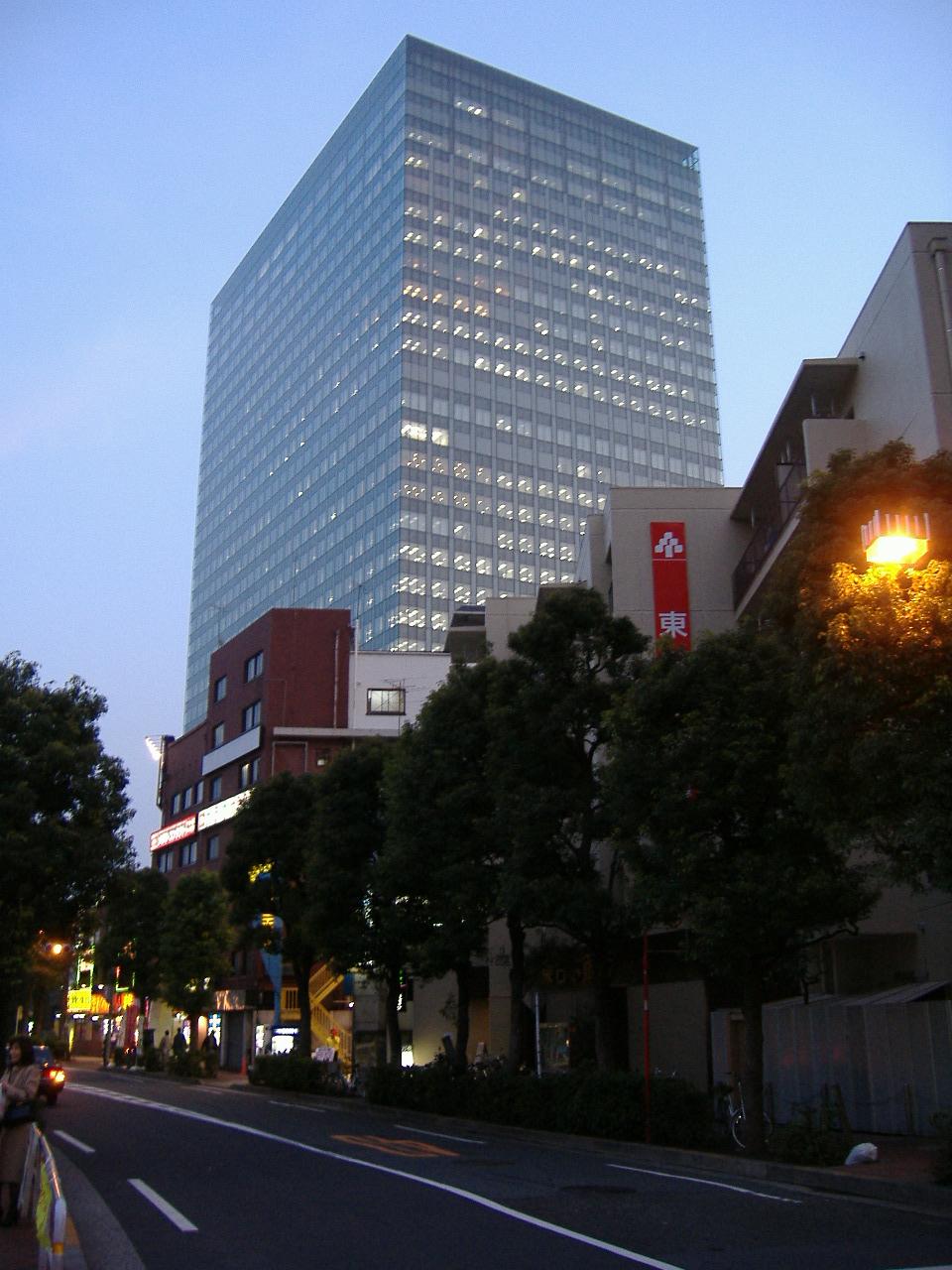
- Interactive map of the ThinkPark Tower area

General information
- Status: Completed
- Location: 2-1-1, Osaki, Shinagawa, Tokyo, Tokyo, Japan
- Coordinates: 35.618434°N 139.727748°E
- Construction started: 2004
- Completed: 2007
- Opened: October 25, 2007

Height
- Architectural: 140.50 m
- Roof: 138.50 m

Technical details
- Floor count: 32 (30 above ground, 2 underground)
- Floor area: 151,937.93m2

Design and construction
- Architect: Nikken Sekkei
- Developer: Meidensha; World Trade Center Building Inc.
- Main contractor: Obayashi Corporation; Kajima Corporation; Kumagai Gumi; Sumitomo Mitsui Construction

Website
- Official website

ThinkPark Tower (シンクパークタワー) is a 30-story skyscraper, part of the ThinkPark redevelopment area in Ōsaki, Tokyo. The building construction started in 2004, based on designs by Nikken Sekkei with additional input from CIA, Inc. / The Brand Architect Group and Neil Denari. It was completed in 2007. The official opening took place on October 25 of the same year.

The ThinkPark complex, which encompasses the building, distinguishes itself by being the first green urbanism project in Japan. Richard Seireeni of The Brand Architect Group named the complex, designed the logo and devised the green urbanism marketing strategy. This approach in turn helped the developers in renting the entire lease space over one year prior to opening. The main functions of the building are office and retail space for companies, restaurants, retail establishments and clinics.

== Tenants ==
=== Office tenants ===
- Sumitomo Heavy Industries headquarters
- Meidensha headquarters
- MOS Burger headquarters
- SEN Corporation headquarters
- Shin Nippon Machinery headquarters
- Dassault Systèmes K.K. headquarters
- PUMA Japan K.K.
- Alcatel-Lucent Japan
- Nippon Boehringer Ingelheim Co. headquarters
- Radio Frequency Systems sales office
- The Marine Foods Corporation headquarters
- Nippon Valqua Industries headquarters
- Sumitomo Mitsui Banking Corporation Osaki branch
- So-net Corporation headquarters

=== Clinics ===
- ThinkPark Tower International Medical Clinic
- Thinkpark Heart Clinic

=== Restaurants and shops ===
The building accommodates Japanese-, Chinese-, and western-style restaurants as well as fast-food establishments like MOS Burger and Denny's. There are shops, pharmacies and other service-oriented businesses on the lower floors.
