= Ōsaki, Tokyo =

District of Shinagawa, Tokyo, Japan

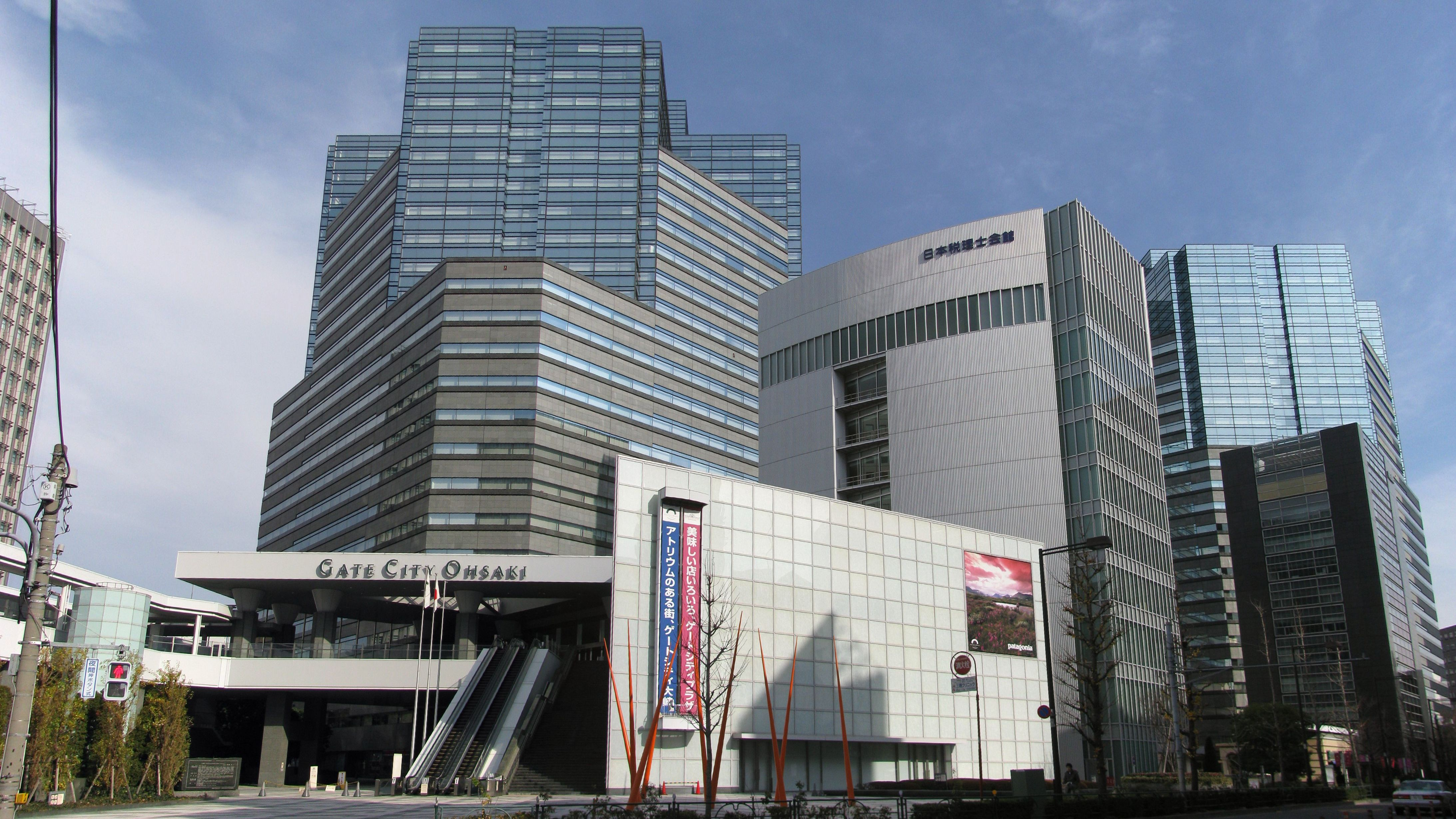
Gate City Ōsaki

Ōsaki (大崎) is a primarily commercial district in the northern part of Shinagawa, Tokyo, Japan. The district has completed several urban renewal projects centered around the Yamanote Line's Ōsaki Station, which include Ōsaki New City in 1987, Gate City Ōsaki in 1999, Art Village Ōsaki in 2007, Oval Court Ōsaki in 2004, and ThinkPark in 2007.

Rissho University, its predecessor established in 1580 and reorganized into a university in 1924, is a private university with the main campus in Ōsaki. The 55th Prime Minister of Japan Tanzan Ishibashi served as this school's president from 1952 to 1968.

Ōsaki is now one of the seven "secondary city centers" (副都心, Fukutoshin) officially designated by the Tokyo Metropolis.

== Economy ==
MOS Burger has its headquarters in the ThinkPark Tower in Ōsaki. Fuji Electric and Lawson have their headquarters in the East Tower of Gate City Ohsaki in Ōsaki. Nippon Chemi-Con, an electronic components manufacturer and Topy Industries, a machinery and automotive components company, are also headquartered in the district. And since August 2018, Sega Sammy, best known for its Sonic the Hedgehog franchise, has its headquarters in at the Sumitomo Fudosan Osaki Garden Tower.

== Transportation ==
Ōsaki is well connected to other areas in Tokyo through rail and road transport. Ōsaki Station is on the Yamanote and Rinkai lines. Ōsaki also has Ōsaki-Hirokōji Station on the Tōkyū Ikegami Line.

== Education ==
Shinagawa City Board of Education operates public elementary and junior high schools.

Hosui Elementary School (芳水小学校) and Ōsaki Junior High School (大崎中学校) are the zoned schools for Ōsaki. 5-chome 2-ban may go to Hino Gakuen (日野学園).
