= Tokyo Port City Takeshiba =

Mixed-use development in Tokyo, Japan

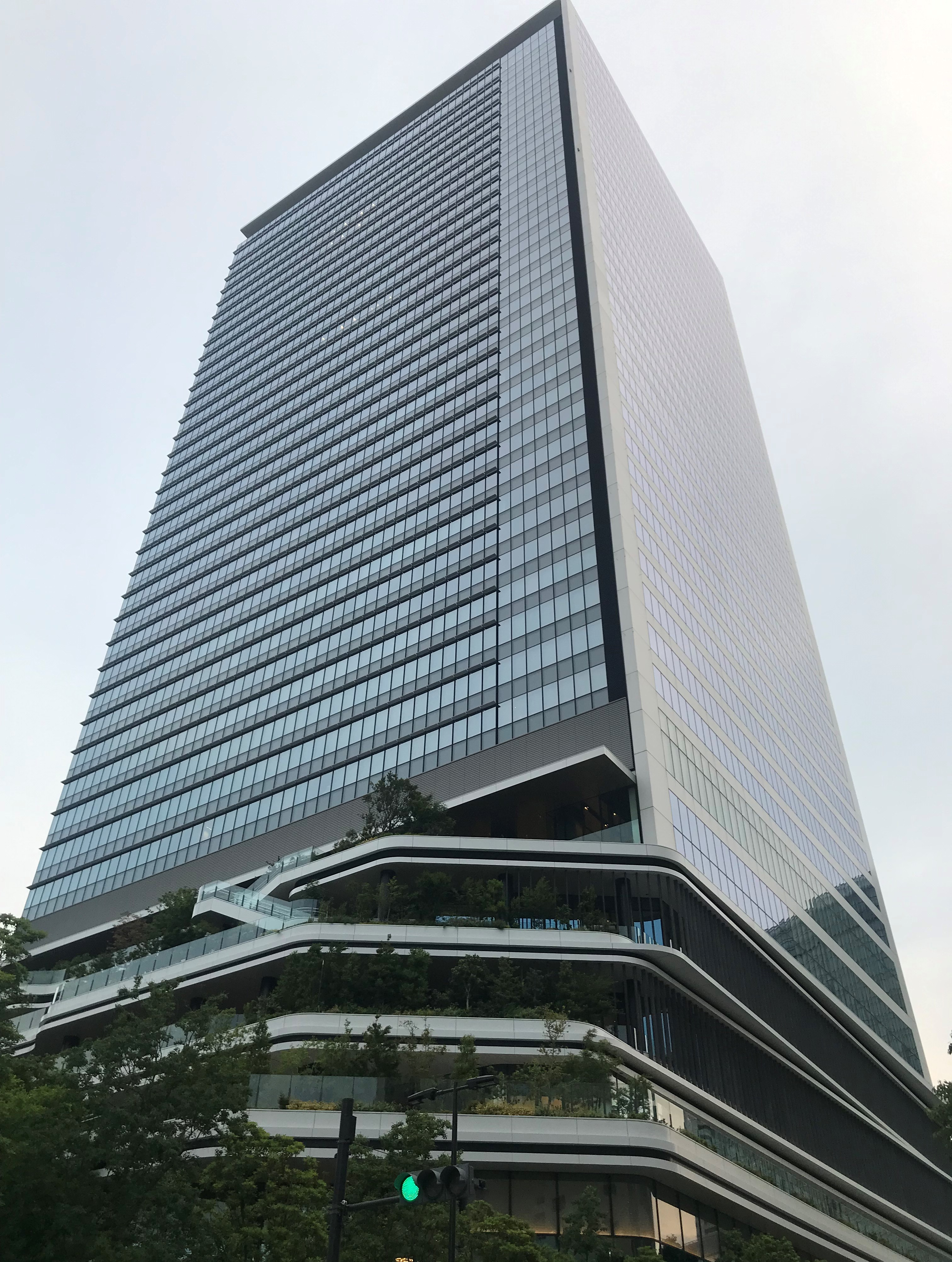
- Tokyo Port City Takeshiba Office Tower

General information
- Type: Residential, Office
- Location: Tokyo, Japan, 1-7-1 Kaigan, Minato
- Coordinates: 35.65520°N 139.76066°E
- Construction started: May 2016
- Completed: May 2020
- Owner: Kajima

Height
- Roof: 208.4 m (684 ft) (Office); 60 m (200 ft) (Residential)

Technical details
- Floor count: 39 (Office); 18 (Residential)
- Floor area: 181,777 m^{2} (1,960,000 sq ft)

Design and construction
- Architects: Kajima Design & Kume Sekkei
- Developer: Albero Grande
- Structural engineer: Haseko/Kajima
- Main contractor: Haseko Corporation

Tokyo Port City Takeshiba is a mixed-use skyscraper complex in the Minato ward of Tokyo, Japan. The complex consists of two towers standing at 208.4 m (684 ft) tall with 39 floors (Office Tower), respectively 60 m (200 ft) tall with 18 floors (Residential Tower). The office tower is the tallest building in Kaigan and Takeshiba.

The project is being undertaken by Albero Grande Co., a member of the Tokyu Land Corporation Group. The office tower houses the headquarters of SoftBank Group and its subsidiaries.

== History ==
When the 1923 Great Kanto Earthquake devastated land transportation networks, Tokyo, lacking a large port, struggled to carry out relief efforts. In response to this situation, the development of a full-fledged port was called for, and starting with the Hinode Pier in 1925, Shibaura Pier and Takeshiba Pier were completed in succession, and Tokyo Port opened to the public on May 20, 1941.

Since its completion, Takeshiba Pier has been used as a base for regular ferry services to the Izu Islands and other destinations. Around the time of the bubble economy, Takeshiba Regional Development (which was absorbed into the Tokyo Teleport Center in 2007), an organization affiliated with the Tokyo Metropolitan Government, built buildings and hotels on the surrounding metropolitan land, and in 1995, the Yurikamome Takeshiba Station also opened. However, the Metropolitan Expressway, which cuts off connections to the Hamamatsucho area, and the concentration of metropolitan government facilities that have reached the end of their lifespan have diminished the town's appeal.

For this reason, the Tokyo Metropolitan Government, based on the development policy for specific projects under the National Strategic Special Zones Plan, made a proposal for the "Urban Regeneration Step-Up Project (Takeshiba District)" to introduce private sector vitality by leasing metropolitan land for a fixed period of 70 years and to revitalize the entire area. In 2013, the Tokyu Land Corporation-Kajima Consortium was selected as the project operator and the project was put into motion.

The facility, completed in 2020 (Reiwa 2), was built on the former site of the Tokyo Metropolitan Archives, the Tokyo Metropolitan Metrology and Inspection Office, and the Hamamatsucho Building of the Tokyo Metropolitan Industrial Trade Center. As a result of the project, the Tokyo Metropolitan Archives moved to Izumichō, Kokubunji City and the Tokyo Metropolitan Metrology and Inspection Office moved to Shinsuna, Kōtō, but the Tokyo Metropolitan Industrial Trade Center Hamamatsucho Building was reopened at the same location, remaining within the office tower.

The complex consists of a 40-story office tower with two basement levels and an 18-story residential tower. A 500-meter-long pedestrian deck (Port Deck) extending from Hamamatsucho Station across the Metropolitan Expressway to Takeshiba Station and Takeshiba Pier was also constructed at the same time. At the time of completion, vertical movement from the first to the third floor (with elevators and escalators) will be required on the east side of JR Hamamatsucho Station, but the North Exit free passage, which crosses the railway tracks, is scheduled to be completed in fiscal year 2026 and connect to the North Exit ticket gates at the third floor level of Hamamatsucho Station.

Minato Ward in Tokyo awarded the "2022 Landscape Town Development Award" in a system that recognizes private facilities and activities that have made significant contributions to the creation of a good landscape.

== Architecture ==
=== Office Tower ===
The office tower located on the Hamamatsucho side is a smart building developed by Tokyu Land Corporation and SoftBank, which uses artificial intelligence and IoT to collect and analyze pedestrian flow data and environmental data inside and outside the building, in order to create a comfortable environment and manage the building efficiently.

The building houses the "Port Hall" event hall on the first floor, "Takeshiba Gourmetrium" consisting of 21 shops, mainly restaurants, on the first to third floors, the "Tokyo Metropolitan Industrial Trade Center Hamamatsucho Hall" on the second to fifth floors, and "Port Studio", a multipurpose studio, as well as "Business Airport Takeshiba", a membership-based shared office operated by Tokyu Land Corporation, and the "CiP Council", a general incorporated association, on the eighth floor. The office lobby is located on the sixth floor, and the ninth to thirty-nine floors are used as offices, with SoftBank Group, SoftBank, and WeWork Japan as tenants.

Major tenant companies SoftBank Group Corp. SoftBank Corp. Livesense Inc. iPlus Co., Ltd. East Investment Capital Co., Ltd. East Investment Capital Co., Ltd. WEB Direction Japan Co., Ltd. CiP Council (General Incorporated Association) Exterior In the lower levels, under the theme of "Takeshiba's Eight New Views," various initiatives related to biodiversity conservation are carried out on the eight-story "Step Terrace", creating a vibrant, multi-level plaza with lush greenery. The upper-level facade opens wide to the sea, and in relation to the former Shiba Rikyu Gardens and Hama Rikyu Gardens, it has a neat, horizontal proportion that harmonizes with the surroundings, and the entire structure is designed with a gate-shaped frame made of precast concrete panels, which reduces the sense of volume while maintaining the symbolic nature of the landmark tower.

Disaster Prevention The tower, which also serves as a tsunami evacuation building, opens its second and third-floor step terraces as an emergency evacuation area when a tsunami warning is issued for Tokyo Bay, accommodating up to 1,170 evacuees.

=== Residential Tower ===
Tokyo Port City Takeshiba Residential Tower

Located on a quiet seaside location this rental apartment complex comprises 182 units in total, including residences, premium residences, serviced apartments, and shared houses. A nursery school operated by Like Academy is located on the first floor.

Based on the concept of "Creative Sail," which is inspired by a "sail" fluttering in the sky with the sea as its backdrop, the exterior, interior, and landscape of Takeshiba were designed with the aim of transforming it into a place where people with diverse international values can interact and bring creativity and vibrancy.

== Gallery ==
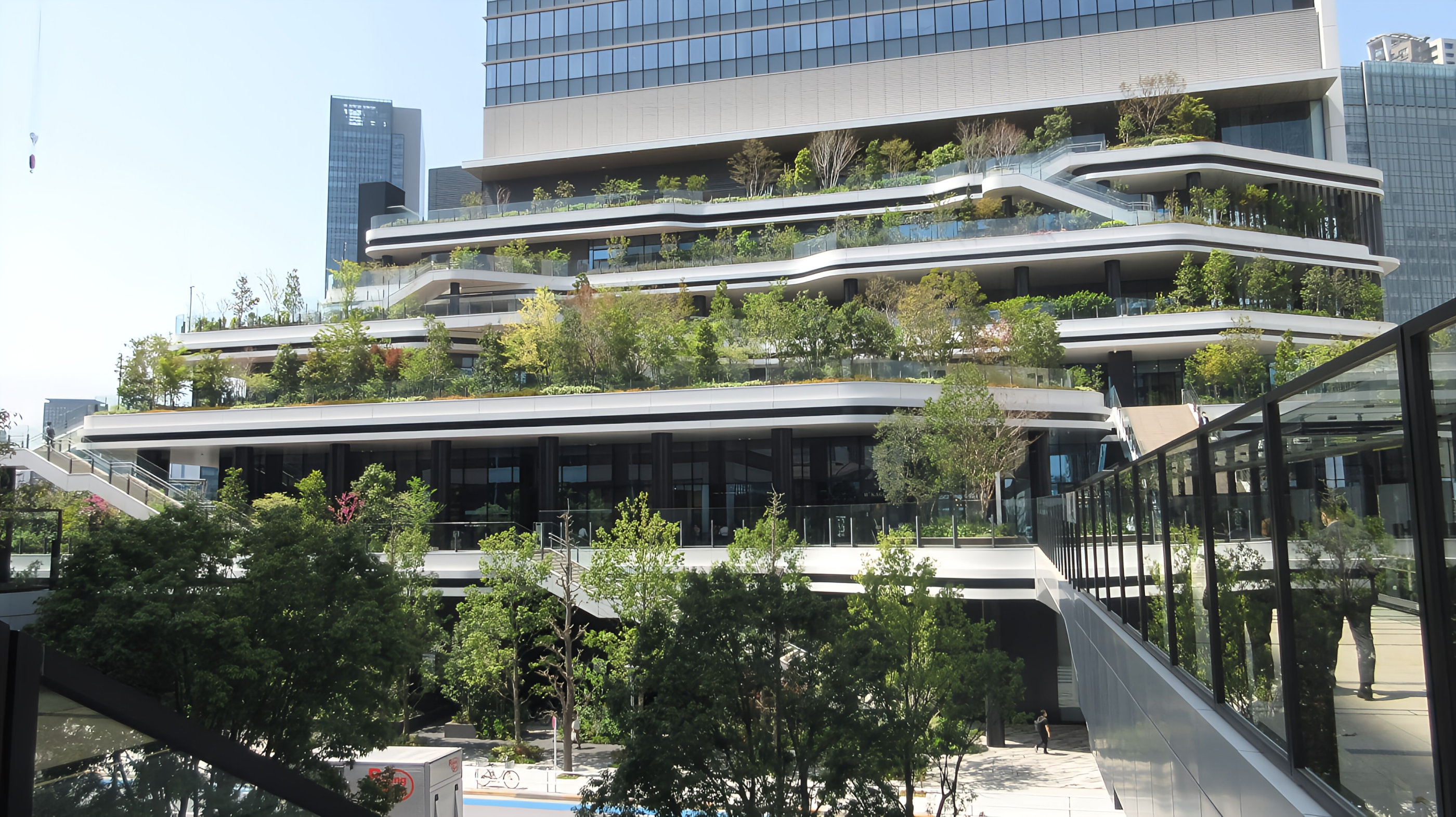
Skip terrace and rooftop garden

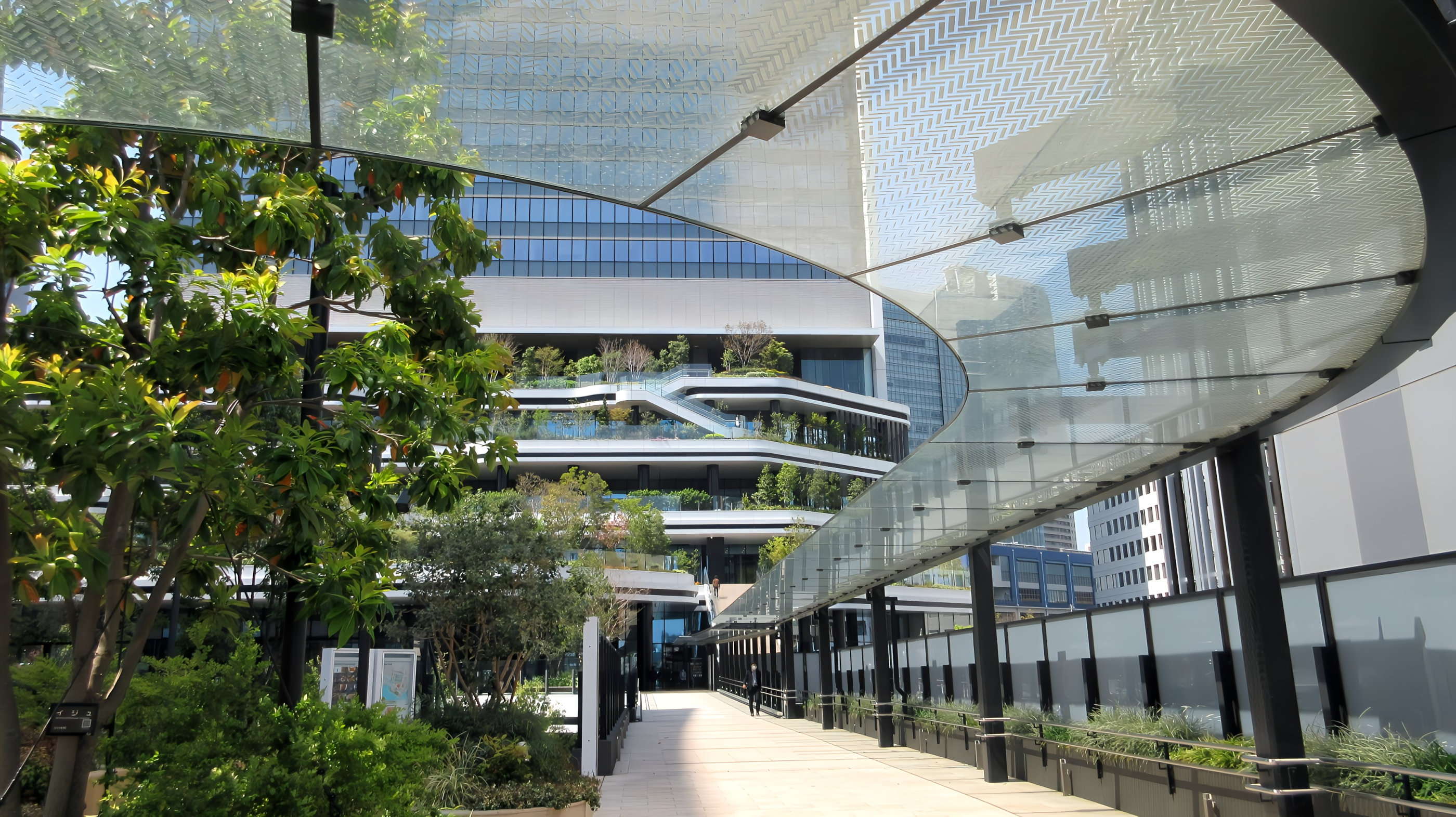
Port Deck (from the direction of Takeshiba Station)

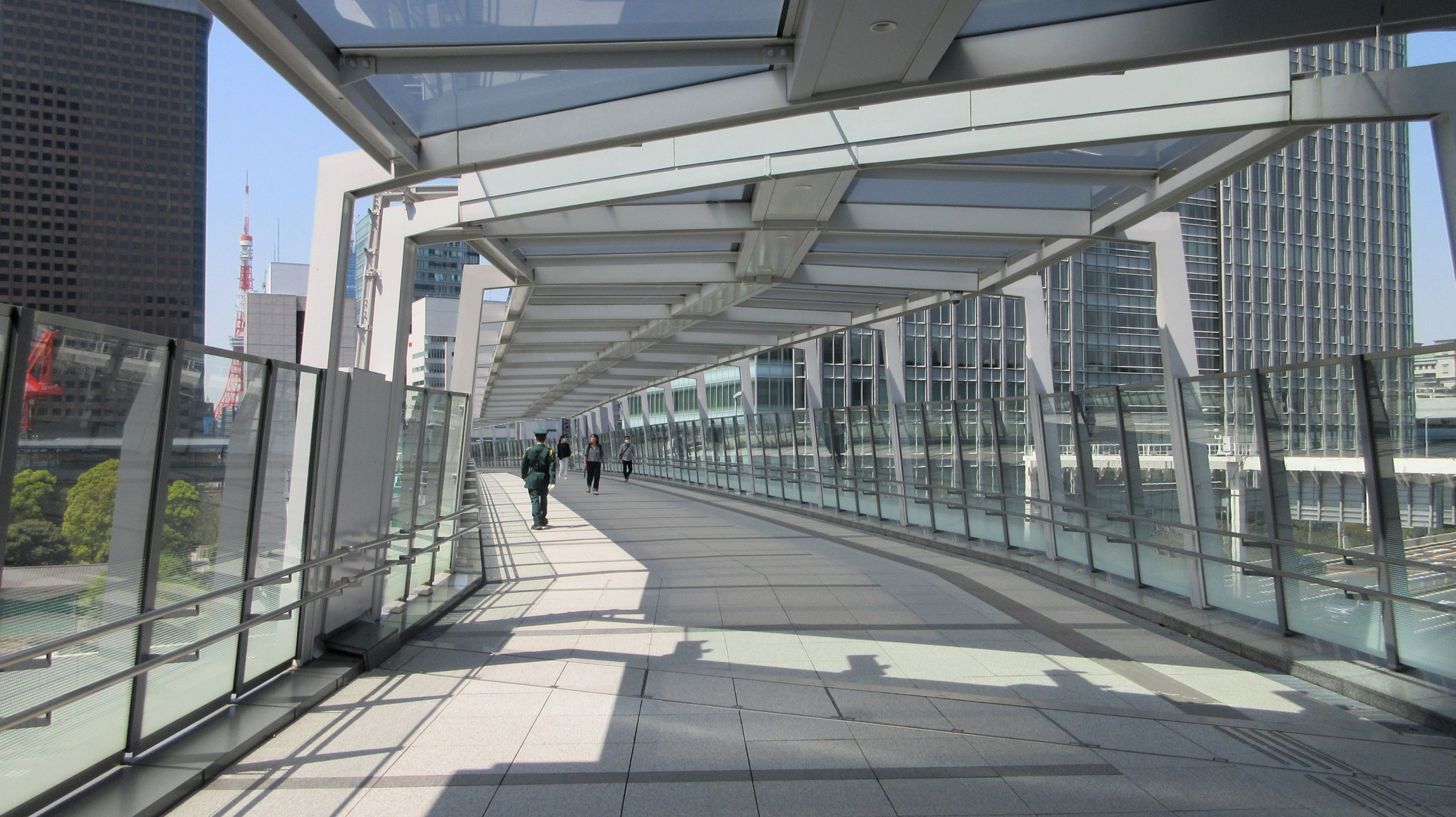
Port Deck (towards Hamamatsucho Station)

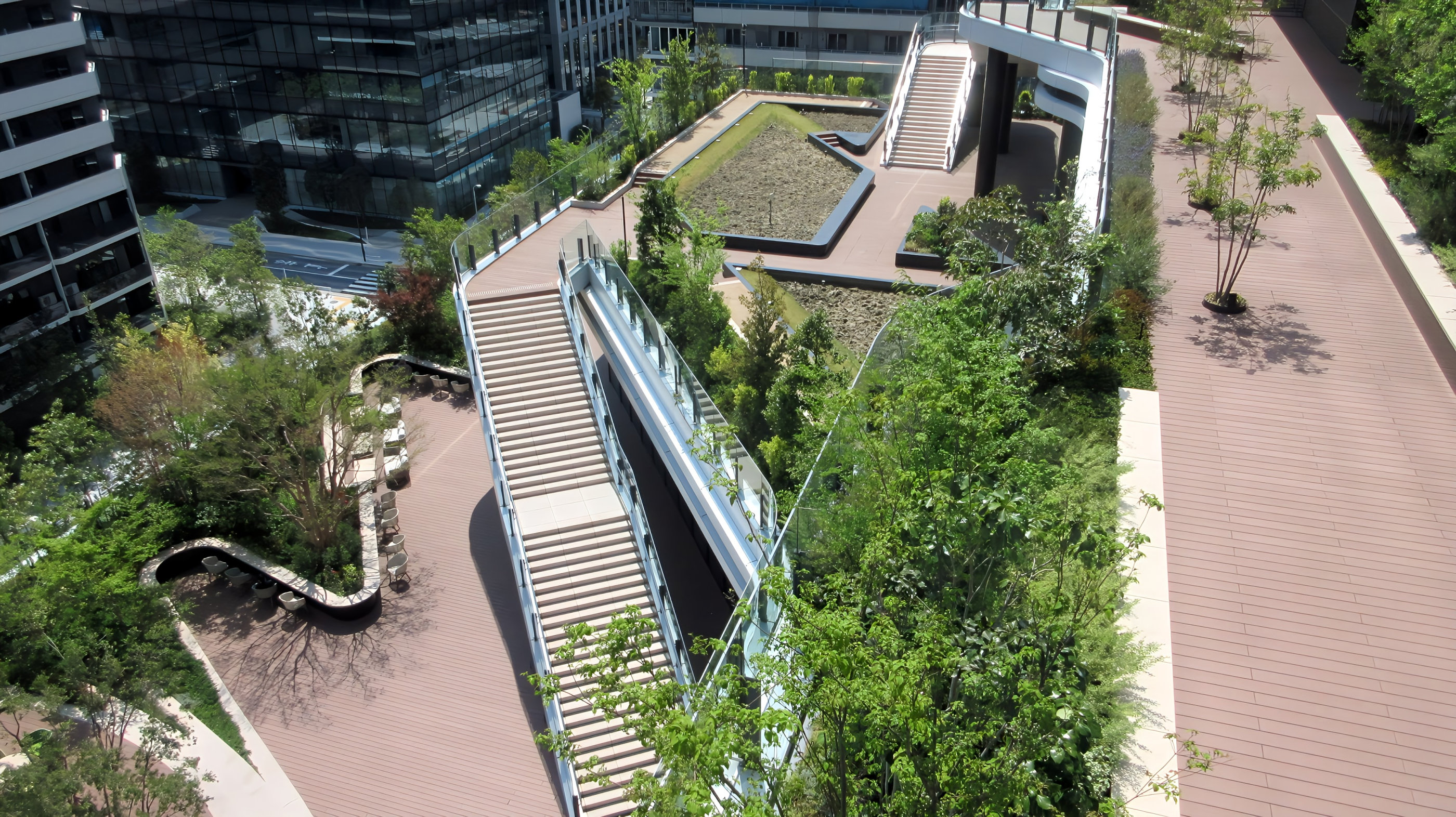
Overlooking the skip terrace

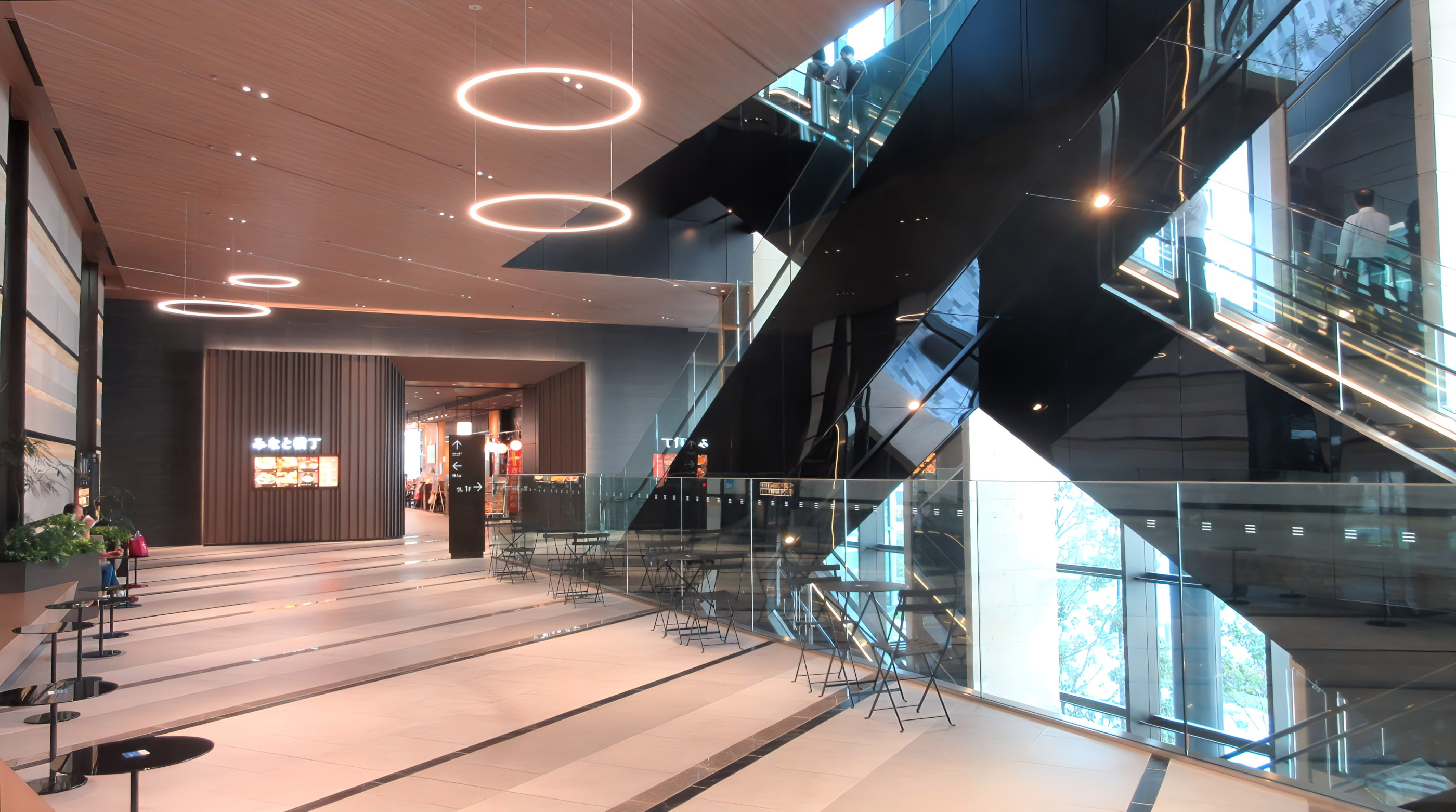
Office Tower 2nd Floor (Minato Yokocho is in the back)

== See also ==
- List of tallest buildings in Japan
- List of tallest structures in Tokyo
