= Nikkei 225 =

Japanese stock market index

- Foundation: 7 September 1950; 76 years ago
- Operator: Nihon Keizai Shimbun (The Nikkei) (Nikkei, Inc.)
- Exchanges: Tokyo Stock Exchange (TSE)
- Constituents: 225
- Weighting method: Price-weighted index
- Related indices: Tokyo Stock Price Index (TOPIX)
- Website: indexes.Nikkei.co.jp

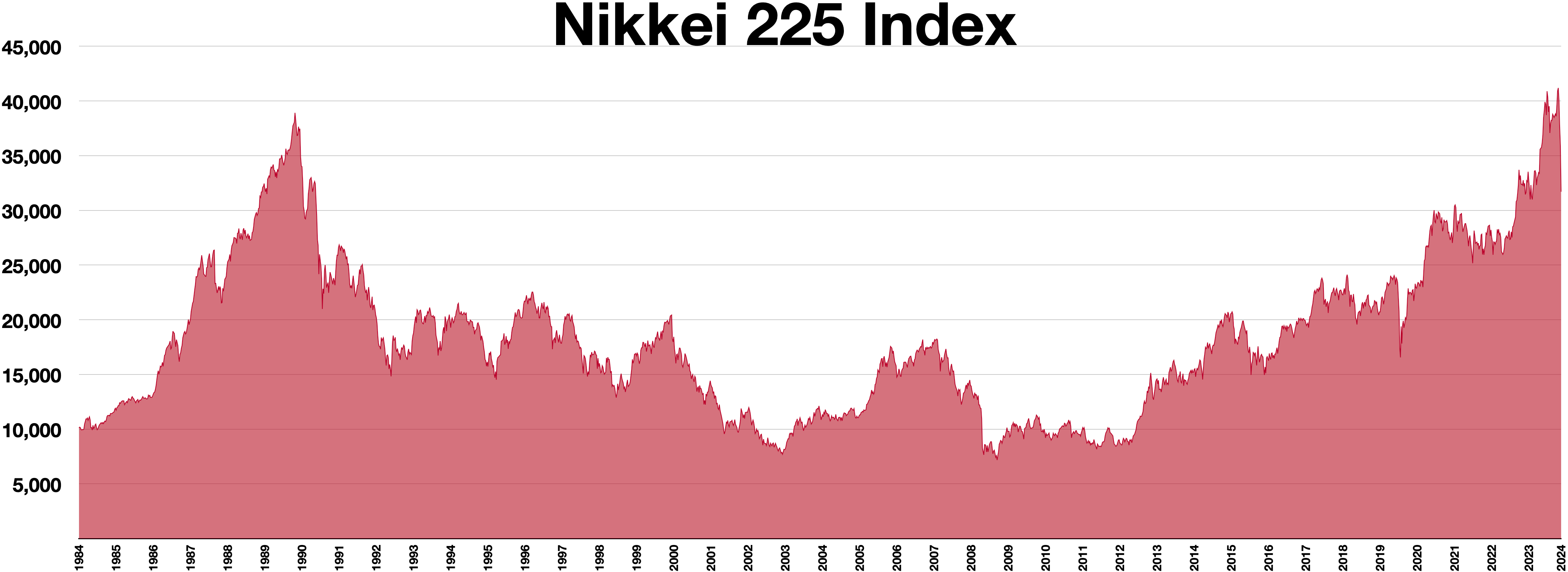
Nikkei 225 Index

The Nikkei 225, or the Nikkei Stock Average (Japanese: 日経平均株価, Hepburn: Nikkei heikin kabuka), more commonly called the Nikkei or the Nikkei index (/ˈnɪkeɪ, ˈniː-, nɪˈkeɪ/), is a stock market index for the Tokyo Stock Exchange (TSE). It is a price-weighted index, operating in the Japanese Yen (JP¥), and its components are reviewed twice a year. The Nikkei 225 measures the performance of 225 highly capitalised and liquid publicly owned companies in Japan from a wide array of industry sectors. Since 2017, the index is calculated every five seconds. It was originally launched by the Tokyo Stock Exchange in 1950, and was taken over by the Nihon Keizai Shimbun (The Nikkei) newspaper in 1970, when the Tokyo Exchange switched to the Tokyo Stock Price Index (TOPIX), which is weighed by market capitalisation rather than stock prices.

== History ==
The Nikkei 225 began to be calculated on 7 September 1950, retroactively calculated back to 16 May 1949 when the average price of its component stocks was ¥176.21 (equivalent to ¥1,554 in 2024) using a divisor of 225. Since July 2017, the index is updated every 5 seconds during trading sessions.

The Nikkei 225 Futures, introduced at Singapore Exchange (SGX) in 1986, the Osaka Securities Exchange (OSE) in 1988, Chicago Mercantile Exchange (CME) in 1990, is now an internationally recognized futures index.

The Nikkei average has deviated sharply from the textbook model of stock averages, which grow at a steady exponential rate. During the Japanese asset price bubble, the average hit its bubble-era record high on 29 December 1989, when it reached an intraday high of 38,957.44, before closing at 38,915.87, having grown sixfold during the decade. Subsequently, it lost nearly all these gains, reaching a post-bubble intraday low of 6,994.90 on 28 October 2008 — 82% below its peak nearly 19 years earlier. The 1989 record high held for 34 years, until it was surpassed in 2024 (see below).

On 15 March 2011, the second working day after the massive earthquake in the northeast part of Japan, the index dropped over 10% to finish at 8,605.15, a loss of 1,015 points. The index continued to drop throughout 2011, bottoming out at 8,160.01 on 25 November, putting it at its lowest close since 31 March 2009. The Nikkei fell over 17% in 2011, finishing the year at 8,455.35, its lowest year-end closing value in nearly thirty years, when the index finished at 8,016.70 in 1982.

The Nikkei started 2013 near 10,600, hitting a peak of 15,942 in May. However, shortly afterward, it plunged by almost 10% before rebounding, making it the most volatile stock market index among the developed markets. By 2015, it had reached over 20,000 mark, marking a gain of over 10,000 in two years, making it one of the fastest growing stock market indices in the world. However, by 2018, the index growth was more moderate at around the 22,000 mark.

There was concern that the rise since 2013 was artificial and due to purchases by the Bank of Japan ("BOJ"). From a start in 2013, by end 2017, the BOJ owned circa 75% of all Japanese Exchange Traded Funds ("ETFs"), and were a top 10 shareholder of 90% of the Nikkei 225 constituents.

On 15 February 2021, the Nikkei average breached the 30,000 benchmark, its highest level in 30 years, due to the levels of monetary stimulus and asset purchase programs executed by the Bank of Japan to mitigate the financial effects of the COVID-19 pandemic.

On 22 February 2024, the Nikkei reached an intraday high of 39,156.97 and closed at 39,098.68, finally surpassing its 1989 record high, an important milestone since the Japanese asset price bubble. On 4 March 2024, the index surpassed 40,000 (intraday and closing) for the first time in history.

On 5 August 2024, amid a global stock market decline, the Nikkei dropped by more than 4,200 points, surpassing 1987's Black Monday as its biggest single-day drop in history. The following day, it bounced back by more than 3,200 points, the largest single-day gain in history.

On the 22nd of june 2026, the Nikkei closed at a record all-time high of 72,353.96 points.

The Nikkei 225 fell 6.2% in morning trading on 6 November 2026, following sharp losses in US stock markets the previous day, particularly among technology and artificial intelligence stocks. The decline was part of a broader sell-off across Asian markets.

== Weighting ==
The index is a price-weighted index. The index is calculated as follows:

$AdjPrice = Price \times AdjFactor$, then $\frac{\sum AdjPrice}{Divisor}$

- Price is the stock price of a component.
- AdjFactor is the price adjustment factor.
- AdjPrice is the adjusted price of the stock after multiplying by the adjustment factor.
- Divisor is the index divisor. The divisor is adjusted each time there is a change in the index's constituents, or a stock split occurs (unless when compensated for the price adjustment factor).

As of 1 October 2026, the divisor is 29.66435840. That is, every ¥100 change in the adjusted price of a constituent stock results in a 3.3710 unit movement in the index.

As of 29 October 2026, the company with the largest influence on the index is Advantest (TYO: 6857), at about 12% weight.

== Contract specifications ==
The Nikkei 225 is traded as a future on the Osaka exchange (OSE). The contract specifications for the Nikkei 225 (OSE ticker symbol JNK) are listed below:

Contract Specifications
Nikkei 225 (JNK)	
Contract Size:	Nikkei 225 Index X Y1,000
Exchange:	OSE
Sector:	Index
Tick Size:	10
Tick Value:	10000 JPY
Big Point Value (BPV):	1000
Denomination:	JPY
Decimal Place:	0

== Annual returns ==
The following table shows the annual development of the Nikkei 225, which was officially calculated back to 16 May 1949, with unofficial calculations extending back to 1914.

Year	Closing level	Change in Index in Points	Change in Index in %
1914	21.12		
1915	32.10	10.98	51.99
1916	41.61	9.51	29.63
1917	41.40	−0.21	−0.50
1918	42.21	0.81	1.96
1919	53.63	11.42	27.06
1920	27.44	−26.19	−48.83
1921	28.88	1.44	5.25
1922	23.97	−4.91	−17.00
1923	22.83	−1.14	−4.76
1924	24.45	1.62	7.10
1925	27.96	3.51	14.36
1926	27.25	−0.71	−2.54
1927	25.82	−1.43	−5.25
1928	25.65	−0.17	−0.66
1929	21.32	−4.33	−16.88
1930	16.82	−4.50	−21.11
1931	16.28	−0.54	−3.21
1932	30.33	14.05	86.30
1933	34.12	3.79	12.50
1934	32.30	−1.82	−5.33
1935	33.76	1.46	4.52
1936	35.94	2.18	6.46
1937	37.33	1.39	3.87
1938	33.66	−3.67	−9.83
1939	44.96	11.30	33.57
1940	37.42	−7.54	−16.77
1941	42.44	5.02	13.42
1942	42.71	0.27	0.64
1943	42.11	−0.60	−1.40
1944	41.82	−0.29	−0.69
1945	40.53	−1.29	−3.08
1946	28.72	−11.81	−29.14
1947	39.31	10.59	36.87
1948	72.84	33.53	85.30
1949	109.91	37.07	50.89
1950	101.91	−8.00	−7.28
1951	166.06	64.15	62.95
1952	362.64	196.58	118.38
1953	377.95	15.31	4.22
1954	356.09	−21.86	−5.78
1955	425.69	69.60	19.55
1956	549.14	123.45	29.00
1957	474.55	−74.59	−13.58
1958	666.54	191.99	40.46
1959	874.88	208.34	31.26
1960	1,356.71	481.83	55.07
1961	1,432.60	75.89	5.59
1962	1,420.43	−12.17	−0.85
1963	1,225.10	−195.33	−13.75
1964	1,216.55	−8.55	−0.70
1965	1,417.83	201.28	16.55
1966	1,452.10	34.27	2.42
1967	1,283.47	−168.63	−11.61
1968	1,714.89	431.42	33.61
1969	2,358.96	644.07	37.56
1970	1,987.14	−371.82	−15.76
1971	2,713.74	726.60	36.57
1972	5,207.94	2,494.20	91.91
1973	4,306.80	−901.14	−17.30
1974	3,817.22	−489.58	−11.37
1975	4,358.60	541.38	14.18
1976	4,990.85	632.25	14.51
1977	4,865.60	−125.25	−2.51
1978	6,001.85	1,136.25	23.35
1979	6,569.47	567.62	9.46
1980	7,116.38	546.91	8.33
1981	7,681.84	565.46	7.95
1982	8,016.67	334.83	4.36
1983	9,893.82	1,877.15	23.42
1984	11,542.60	1,648.78	16.66
1985	13,113.32	1,570.72	13.61
1986	18,701.30	5,587.98	42.61
1987	21,564.00	2,862.70	15.31
1988	30,159.00	8,595.00	39.86
1989	38,915.87	8,756.87	29.04
1990	23,848.71	−15,067.16	−38.72
1991	22,983.77	−864.94	−3.63
1992	16,924.95	−6,058.82	−26.36
1993	17,417.24	492.29	2.91
1994	19,723.06	2,305.82	13.24
1995	19,868.15	145.09	0.74
1996	19,361.35	−506.80	−2.55
1997	15,258.74	−4,102.61	−21.19
1998	13,842.17	−1.416,57	−9.28
1999	18,934.34	5,092.17	36.79
2000	13,785.69	−5,148.65	−27.19
2001	10,542.62	−3,243.07	−23.52
2002	8,578.95	−1,963.67	−18.63
2003	10,676.64	2,097.69	24.45
2004	11,488.76	812.12	7.61
2005	16,111.43	4,622.67	40.24
2006	17,225.83	1,114.40	6.92
2007	15,307.78	−1,918.05	−11.13
2008	8,859.56	−6,448.22	−42.12
2009	10,546.44	1,686.88	19.04
2010	10,228.92	−317.52	−3.01
2011	8,455.35	−1,773.57	−17.24
2012	10,395.18	1,939.83	22.94
2013	16,291.31	5,896.13	56.72
2014	17,450.77	1,159.46	7.12
2015	19,033.71	1,582.94	9.07
2016	19,114.40	80.69	0.42
2017	22,764.94	3,650.54	19.10
2018	20,014.77	−2,750.17	−12.08
2019	23,656.62	3,641.85	18.20
2020	27,444.17	3,787.55	16.01
2021	28,791.71	1,347.54	4.68
2022	26,094.50	−2,697.21	−9.37
2023	33,464.17	7,369.67	28.24
2024	39,894.54	6,430.37	19.21
2025	50,339.48	10,444.94	26.18

== Components ==
Components grouped by GICS sector
1. Energy (0.30%)
2. Materials (7.00%)
3. Industrials (18.0%)
4. Consumer discretionary (21.0%)
5. Consumer staples (5.00%)
6. Healthcare (10.0%)
7. Financials (3.00%)
8. Information technology (24.0%)
9. Communication services (9.50%)
10. Utilities (0.20%)
11. Real estate (2.00%)

It is not recorded how components were originally selected, or why there are 225 components. Today, components are selected by "considering the weights of the industrial sectors". Constituents must be highly traded ("liquid"). Constituents are changed either at periodic review one per year, or by "extraordinary replacement", for example if a company is delisted.

As of April 2026, the Nikkei 225 consists of the following companies (Japanese securities identification code in parentheses): Bold indicates the top ten by market capitalisation.

=== Air transport ===
- ANA Holdings Inc. (TYO: 9202)
- Japan Airlines Co., Ltd. (TYO: 9201)

=== Automotive ===
- Archion Corp. (TYO: 543A)
- Honda Motor Co., Ltd. (TYO: 7267)
- Isuzu Motors Ltd. (TYO: 7202)
- Mazda Motor Corp. (TYO: 7261)
- Mitsubishi Motors Corp. (TYO: 7211)
- Nissan Motor Co., Ltd. (TYO: 7201)
- Subaru Corp. (TYO: 7270)
- Suzuki Motor Corp. (TYO: 7269)
- Toyota Motor Corp. (TYO: 7203)
- Yamaha Motor Company, Ltd. (TYO: 7272)

=== Banking ===
- Aozora Bank, Ltd. (TYO: 8304)
- The Chiba Bank, Ltd. (TYO: 8331)
- Fukuoka Financial Group, Inc. (TYO: 8354)
- Mitsubishi UFJ Financial Group, Inc. (TYO: 8306)
- Mizuho Financial Group, Inc. (TYO: 8411)
- Resona Holdings, Inc. (TYO: 8308)
- Shizuoka Financial Group (TYO: 5831)(Holding company for Shizuoka Bank)
- Sumitomo Mitsui Financial Group, Inc. (TYO: 8316)
- Sumitomo Mitsui Trust Holdings, Inc. (TYO: 8309)
- Yokohama Financial Group (TYO: 7186)

=== Chemicals ===
- Asahi Kasei Corp. (TYO: 3407)
- Denka Co., Ltd. (TYO: 4061)
- Fujifilm Holdings Corp. (TYO: 4901)
- Kao Corp. (TYO: 4452)
- Kuraray Co., Ltd. (TYO: 3405)
- Mitsubishi Chemical Holdings Corp. (TYO: 4188)
- Mitsui Chemicals, Inc. (TYO: 4183)
- Nissan Chemical Industries, Ltd. (TYO: 4021)
- Nitto Denko (TYO: 6988)
- Resonac Corp. (TYO: 4004)
- **Shin-Etsu Chemical Co., Ltd. (TYO: 4063)**
- Shiseido Co., Ltd. (TYO: 4911)
- Sumitomo Chemical Co., Ltd. (TYO: 4005)
- Tokuyama Corporation (TYO: 4043)
- Tosoh Corp. (TYO: 4042)
- Ube Industries, Ltd. (TYO: 4208)

=== Communications ===
- **KDDI Corp. (TYO: 9433)**
- Nippon Telegraph & Telephone Corp. (TYO: 9432)
- SoftBank Corp. (TYO: 9434)
- **SoftBank Group Corp. (TYO: 9984)**

=== Construction ===
- Comsys Holdings Corp. (TYO: 1721)
- Daiwa House Industry Co., Ltd. (TYO: 1925)
- Haseko Corp. (TYO: 1808)
- JGC Corporation (TYO: 1963)
- Kajima Corp. (TYO: 1812)
- Obayashi Corp. (TYO: 1802)
- Sekisui House, Ltd. (TYO: 1928)
- Shimizu Corp. (TYO: 1803)
- Taisei Corp. (TYO: 1801)

=== Electric machinery ===
- **Advantest Corp. (TYO: 6857)**
- Alps Alpine Co., Ltd. (TYO: 6770)
- Canon Inc. (TYO: 7751)
- Denso Corp. (TYO: 6902)
- **FANUC Corp. (TYO: 6954)**
- Fuji Electric Co., Ltd. (TYO: 6504)
- Fujitsu Ltd. (TYO: 6702)
- Hitachi, Ltd. (TYO: 6501)
- Keyence Corp. (TYO: 6861)
- Kioxia Holdings Corp. (TYO: 285A)
- Kyocera Corp. (TYO: 6971)
- Lasertec (TYO: 6920)
- MinebeaMitsumi, Inc. (TYO: 6479)
- Mitsubishi Electric Corp. (TYO: 6503)
- Murata Manufacturing Co., Ltd. (TYO: 6981)
- NEC Corp. (TYO: 6701)
- Nidec (TYO: 6594)
- Omron Corp. (TYO: 6645)
- Panasonic Corp. (TYO: 6752)
- Renesas Electronics(TYO: 6723)
- Ricoh Co., Ltd. (TYO: 7752)
- Rohm Co., Ltd. (TYO: 6963)
- SCREEN Holdings (TYO: 7735)
- Seiko Epson Corp. (TYO: 6724)
- Sharp Corporation (TYO: 6753)
- Sony Corp. (TYO: 6758)
- Socionext Inc. (TYO: 6526)
- Taiyo Yuden Co., Ltd. (TYO: 6976)
- **TDK Corp. (TYO: 6762)**
- **Tokyo Electron Ltd. (TYO: 8035)**
- Yaskawa Electric Corporation, Limited (TYO: 6506)
- Yokogawa Electric Corp. (TYO: 6841)

=== Electric power ===
- Chubu Electric Power Co., Inc. (TYO: 9502)
- The Kansai Electric Power Co., Inc. (TYO: 9503)
- Tokyo Electric Power Company Holdings, Incorporated (TYO: 9501)

=== Fishery ===
- Nissui Corporation (TYO: 1332)

=== Foods ===
- Ajinomoto Co., Inc. (TYO: 2802)
- Asahi Group Holdings, Ltd. (TYO: 2502)
- Japan Tobacco Inc. (TYO: 2914)
- Kikkoman Corp. (TYO: 2801)
- Kirin Holdings Co, Ltd (TYO: 2503)
- Meiji Holdings Company, Limited (TYO: 2269)
- NH Foods Ltd. (TYO: 2282)
- Nichirei Corp. (TYO: 2871)
- Nisshin Seifun Group Inc. (TYO: 2002)
- Sapporo Holdings Ltd. (TYO: 2501)

=== Gas ===
- Osaka Gas Co., Ltd. (TYO: 9532)
- Tokyo Gas Co., Ltd. (TYO: 9531)

=== Glass & ceramics ===
- AGC Inc. (TYO: 5201)
- NGK Insulators, Ltd. (TYO: 5333)
- Nippon Electric Glass Co., Ltd. (TYO: 5214)
- Taiheiyo Cement Corp. (TYO: 5233)
- Tokai Carbon Co., Ltd. (TYO: 5301)
- Toto Ltd. (TYO: 5332)

=== Insurance ===
- Dai-ichi Life Insurance Company, Limited (TYO: 8750)
- MS&AD Insurance Group, Inc. (TYO: 8725)
- Sompo Holdings, Inc. (TYO: 8630)
- T&D Holdings, Inc. (TYO: 8795)
- Tokio Marine Holdings, Inc. (TYO: 8766)

=== Land transport ===
- Nippon Express Holdings Inc. (TYO: 9147)(Holding company for Nippon Express)
- Yamato Holdings Co., Ltd. (TYO: 9064)

=== Machinery ===
- Amada Co. Ltd. (TYO: 6113)
- Daikin Industries, Ltd. (TYO: 6367)
- Ebara Corp. (TYO: 6361)
- Hitachi Construction Machinery Co., Ltd. (TYO: 6305)
- Kanadevia Corp. (TYO: 7004)
- IHI Corp. (TYO: 7013)
- The Japan Steel Works, Ltd. (TYO: 5631)
- JTEKT Corp. (TYO: 6473)
- Komatsu Ltd. (TYO: 6301)
- Kubota Corp. (TYO: 6326)
- Mitsubishi Heavy Industries, Ltd. (TYO: 7011)
- NSK Ltd. (TYO: 6471)
- NTN Corp. (TYO: 6472)
- Okuma Holdings, Inc. (TYO: 6103)
- Sumitomo Heavy Industries, Ltd. (TYO: 6302)
- SMC Corporation (TYO: 6273)

=== Marine transport ===
- Kawasaki Kisen Kaisha, Ltd. (TYO: 9107)
- Mitsui O.S.K. Lines, Ltd. (TYO: 9104)
- Nippon Yusen K.K. (TYO: 9101)

=== Mining ===
- Inpex Corp. (TYO: 1605)

=== Nonferrous metals ===
- Dowa Holdings Co., Ltd. (TYO: 5714)
- **Fujikura Ltd. (TYO: 5803)**
- The Furukawa Electric Co., Ltd. (TYO: 5801)
- Mitsubishi Materials Corp. (TYO: 5711)
- Mitsui Mining & Smelting Co., Ltd. (TYO: 5706)
- SUMCO Corp. (TYO: 3436)
- Sumitomo Electric Industries, Ltd. (TYO: 5802)
- Sumitomo Metal Mining Co., Ltd. (TYO: 5713)

=== Other financial services ===
- Credit Saison Co., Ltd. (TYO: 8253)
- Japan Exchange Group Inc. (TYO: 8697)
- Orix Co. (TYO: 8591)

=== Other manufacturing ===
- Bandai Namco Holdings, Inc. (TYO: 7832)
- Dai Nippon Printing Co., Ltd. (TYO: 7912)
- Toppan Printing Co., Ltd. (TYO: 7911)
- Yamaha Corporation (TYO: 7951)

=== Petroleum ===
- Eneos Holdings (TYO: 5020)
- Idemitsu Kosan Co., Ltd (TYO: 5019)

=== Pharmaceuticals ===
- Astellas Pharma Inc. (TYO: 4503)
- **Chugai Pharmaceutical Co., Ltd. (TYO: 4519)**
- Daiichi Sankyo Company, Limited (TYO: 4568)
- Eisai Co., Ltd. (TYO: 4523)
- Kyowa Hakko Kirin Co., Ltd. (TYO: 4151)
- Otsuka Holdings Co., Ltd. (TYO: 4578)
- Sumitomo Dainippon Pharma Co., Ltd. (TYO: 4506)
- Shionogi & Co., Ltd. (TYO: 4507)
- Takeda Pharmaceutical Company Limited (TYO: 4502)

=== Precision instruments ===
- Disco Corporation Ltd. (TYO: 6146)
- Hoya Corporation (TYO: 7741)
- Konica Minolta Holdings, Inc. (TYO: 4902)
- Nikon Corp. (TYO: 7731)
- Olympus Corp. (TYO: 7733)
- Terumo Corp. (TYO: 4543)

=== Pulp & paper ===
- Oji Holdings Corporation (TYO: 3861)

=== Railway/bus ===
- Central Japan Railway Company (TYO: 9022)
- East Japan Railway Company (TYO: 9020)
- Keio Corp. (TYO: 9008)
- Keisei Electric Railway Co., Ltd. (TYO: 9009)
- Odakyu Electric Railway Co., Ltd. (TYO: 9007)
- Tobu Railway Co., Ltd. (TYO: 9001)
- Tokyu Corp. (TYO: 9005)
- West Japan Railway Company (TYO: 9021)

=== Real estate ===
- Mitsubishi Estate Co., Ltd. (TYO: 8802)
- Mitsui Fudosan Co., Ltd (TYO: 8801)
- Sumitomo Realty & Development Co., Ltd. (TYO: 8830)
- Tokyo Tatemono Co., Ltd. (TYO: 8804)
- Tokyu Land Corp. (TYO: 3289)

=== Retail ===
- Aeon Co., Ltd. (TYO: 8267)
- **Fast Retailing Co., Ltd. (TYO: 9983)**
- Isetan Mitsukoshi Holdings Ltd. (TYO: 3099)
- J. Front Retailing Co., Ltd. (TYO: 3086)
- Marui Group Co., Ltd. (TYO: 8252)
- Muji Co., Ltd (TYO: 7453)
- Nitori Holdings Co., Ltd. (TYO: 9843)
- Pan Pacific International Holdings Corp. (TYO: 7532)
- Seven & I Holdings Co., Ltd. (TYO: 3382)
- Takashimaya Co., Ltd. (TYO: 8233)
- ZOZO Co., Ltd (TYO: 3092)

=== Rubber ===
- Bridgestone Corp. (TYO: 5108)
- The Yokohama Rubber Co., Ltd. (TYO: 5101)

=== Securities ===
- Daiwa Securities Group Inc. (TYO: 8601)
- Nomura Holdings, Inc. (TYO: 8604)

=== Services ===
- Baycurrent Inc. (TYO: 6532)
- CyberAgent Inc. (TYO: 4751)
- Dena Co., Ltd. (TYO: 2432)
- Dentsu Inc. (TYO: 4324)
- Japan Post Holdings Co., Ltd. (TYO: 6178)
- Konami Corp. (TYO: 9766)
- LY Corporation (TYO: 4689)
- Mercari Inc. (TYO: 4385)
- M3 Inc. (TYO: 2413) (Parent company for MDLinx)
- Nexon Co., Ltd. (TYO: 3659)
- Nintendo Co., Ltd. (TYO: 7974)
- Nomura Research Institute Ltd. (TYO: 4307)
- Oriental Land Co., Ltd. (TYO: 4661)
- Rakuten Inc. (TYO: 4755)
- Recruit Holdings Co., Ltd. (TYO: 6098)
- Secom Co., Ltd. (TYO: 9735)
- SHIFT Inc. (TYO: 3697)
- Toho Co., Ltd. (TYO: 9602)
- Trend Micro Inc. (TYO: 4704)

=== Shipbuilding ===
- Kawasaki Heavy Industries, Ltd. (TYO: 7012)

=== Steel ===
- JFE Holdings, Inc. (TYO: 5411)
- Kobe Steel, Ltd. (TYO: 5406)
- Nippon Steel Corp. (TYO: 5401)

=== Textiles & apparel ===
- Teijin Ltd. (TYO: 3401)
- Toray Industries, Inc. (TYO: 3402)

=== Trading companies ===
- Itochu Corp. (TYO: 8001)
- Marubeni Corp. (TYO: 8002)
- Mitsubishi Corp. (TYO: 8058)
- Mitsui & Co., Ltd. (TYO: 8031)
- Sojitz Corp. (TYO: 2768)
- Sumitomo Corp. (TYO: 8053)
- Toyota Tsusho Corp. (TYO: 8015)

== Statistics ==
As of 22 June 2026 (records going back to 16 May 1949):

- Lowest value: 85.25 on 6 July 1950
- Highest value (closing): 72,366.34 on 25 June 2026
- Highest value (intraday): 72,831.73 on 22 June 2026
- Largest gain (absolute): +3,320.72 to 62,833.84 on 7 May 2026
- Largest gain (relative): +14.15% to 9,447.57 on 14 October 2008
- Longest winning streak: 16 consecutive trading days from 2 to 24 October 2017
- Largest fall (absolute): −4,451.28 to 31,458.42 on 5 August 2024
- Largest fall (relative): −14.90% to 21,910.08 on 20 October 1987
- Longest losing streak: 15 consecutive trading days from 28 April to 18 May 1954

=== Closing milestones ===
- 200 (200.60) on 19 April 1952
- 300 (302.73) on 17 October 1952
- 500 (500.70) on 6 June 1956
- 750 (750.63) on 23 March 1959
- 1,000 (1,002.46) on 20 February 1960
- 1,500 (1,501.50) on 30 January 1961
- 2,000 (2,002.46) on 31 May 1969
- 2,500 (2,504.84) on 26 March 1970
- 3,000 (3,013.46) on 26 February 1972
- 4,000 (4,007.66) on 16 August 1972
- 5,000 (5,025.54) on 22 December 1972
- 6,000 (6,002.74) on 1 December 1978
- 7,000 (7,000.04) on 12 September 1980
- 8,000 (8,019.14) on 17 August 1981
- 9,000 (9,015.76) on 7 July 1983
- 10,000 (10,053.81) on 9 January 1984
- 15,000 (15,013.19) on 22 March 1986
- 20,000 (20,048.35) on 30 January 1987
- 25,000 (25,049.40) on 3 June 1987
- 30,000 (30,050.82) on 7 December 1988
- 35,000 (35,084.15) on 16 August 1989

The index closed at 38,915.87 on 29 December 1989. No further record close was set by the index for another 34 years until 22 February 2024, when the index closed at 39,098.68.

- 40,000 (40,109.23) on 4 March 2024
- 45,000 (45,303.43) on 18 September 2025
- 50,000 (50,512.32) on 27 October 2025
- 55,000 (56,363.94) on 9 February 2026
- 60,000 (60,537.36) on 27 April 2026
- 65,000 (65,158.19) on 25 May 2026
- 70,000 (71,053.49) on 18 June 2026

== See also ==
- S&P/TOPIX 150
