= NYSE Arca Tech 100 Index =

NYSE Arca Tech 100
- Foundation: 1982; 44 years ago
- Operator: New York Stock Exchange
- Exchanges: NYSE and other US exchanges
- Trading symbol: ^PSE
- Constituents: 100
- Type: Large-cap
- Weighting method: Price-weighted index
- Website: www.nyse.com/quote/index/PSE

The NYSE Arca Tech 100 Index is a price-weighted index composed of common stocks and ADRs of technology-related companies listed on US stock exchanges. The index is maintained by the New York Stock Exchange, but includes stocks that trade on exchanges other than the NYSE. Companies from different industries that produce or deploy innovative technologies to conduct their business are considered for inclusion. Leading companies are selected from several industries, including computer hardware, software, semiconductors, telecommunications, electronics, aerospace and defense, health care equipment, and biotechnology.

Modeled as a multi-industry technology index, the objective of the NYSE Arca Tech 100 Index is to provide a benchmark for measuring the performance of companies utilizing technology innovation across a broad spectrum of industries.

Unlike other indexes, whose historic returns date back only a few months or years, the NYSE Arca Tech 100 Index has been tracked since 1982, when it was initiated by the Pacific Exchange. It is one of the oldest technology indexes calculated.

An ETF traded on this index but it was liquidated and closed in December of 2008.
