= Laser Induced Deep Etching =

Laser Induced Deep Etching (LIDE) is a glass microfabrication technique. The two-step process enables precise, high-aspect-ratio microstructures in thin glass substrates, avoiding defects such as microcracks or chipping. LIDE is often used for applications requiring high-precision through-glass vias (TGVs) and other intricate glass structures for semiconductor packaging and high-frequency communication devices.

== Origins and development ==
The technology was introduced in 2017 by LPKF Laser & Electronics AG as an enabling technology for precision glass processing in microsystems and semiconductor applications.

In 2018, LIDE was used to create fine-glass-masks (FGMs) for OLED displays, offering a potential alternative to fine-metal-masks (FMMs), which are commonly used in structured OLED material deposition. The technology is more commonly utilised in advanced IC packaging, where it enables the processing of glass wafers and panels with through-glass vias (TGVs) for semiconductor packaging and MEMS devices. LIDE technology has also been used to fabricate high-frequency RF and mm-wave communication components, particularly for system-in-package (SiP) systems. It enables the creation of high-precision TGVs, cavities, and cutouts essential for electromagnetically and galvanically coupled transitions in dielectric waveguide (DWG) applications. These transitions allow for RF signal coupling above 150 GHz. The technique won the SID Honorary Award during the Society for Information Display (SID) Display Week in the United States in May 2019.

In May 2020, a licence agreement was concluded with Nippon Electric Glass (NEG), under which NEG uses LIDE technology for the mass production of glass components, including cover glass, substrate glass and other glass components. Besides the agreement with NEG, the technology is offered to the market without any limit.

== Process ==
LIDE enables the creation of deep structures in thin glass with high aspect ratios exceeding 1:10, resulting in structures as small as 5 μm or less.

=== Laser Modification ===
A single laser pulse locally modifies the glass according to the desired layout, penetrating either through the entire thickness of the substrate or to an individually definable point. For the production of TGVs, LIDE modifies the glass to change its isotropic etching characteristics to anisotropic, allowing for precise aperture creation with well-defined sizes such as 2–3 μm.

=== Deep Etching ===
In the second step, the entire glass surface undergoes isotropic wet chemical etching. The laser-modified regions etch at a significantly faster rate than unmodified areas, resulting in the formation of precise microstructures. The process allows for the creation of glass structures with varied profiles, such as rounded, dimpled, or flat bottoms, depending on the specific requirements of the application. Additionally, it enables the fabrication of high-aspect-ratio structures with dimensions ranging from micrometres to millimetres. LIDE can also be applied to both single-layer and double-layer glass chips.

== Applications (selection) ==
LIDE technology is particularly beneficial in fields requiring precise glass microstructures. The technology is employed in the production of microchips and sensors, with applications extending to industries such as automotive and aerospace, and for smartphone displays.

LIDE technology enables the creation of high-frequency communication systems, such as radar sensors, that require integration of multiple functions in small form factors. This development was part of the GlaRA research project, a publicly funded research project by LPKF Laser & Electronics AG with partners such as the Fraunhofer Institute for Reliability and Micro-integration.

- Semiconductor Manufacturing: Fabrication of through-glass vias (TGVs) for advanced panel and wafer level packaging. Compact, high-frequency transitions for mm-wave radar sensors and RF communication systems, supporting low-cost glass-based SiP systems.
- Microfluidics: Creation of intricate channels and cavities for lab-on-a-chip devices.
- Micro-electro-mechanical systems: Fabrication of high-precision glass components such as actuators and sensors.
- Optoelectronics: Development of components necessitating high-quality glass features, such as displays.
- Biotechnology: Used for fabricating microwell arrays for live single-cell imaging. LIDE microwells enable long-term cell culture, clonal expansion, and studies of cell migration, offering high-resolution imaging of cellular processes.
- Immunoassays: LIDE-fabricated microwells are suitable for studying immune cell cytotoxicity, including interactions between adherent and suspension cells.

== Advantages and disadvantages ==
The process yields microstructures without microcracks, chipping, or heat-induced stress, preserving the inherent strength and optical clarity of the glass.

LIDE enables the fabrication of structures with sub-micron precision, making it suitable for high-resolution imaging-based applications. It is also highly scalable, allowing for cost-effective production of complex glass components. FGMs made using LIDE technology offer advantages like absence of shadowing effects and the prevention of wrinkles.

However, the technique is dependent on specific laser equipment and etching solutions, which limits its accessibility and increases spatial footprint. LIDE technology offers limited 2.5D structuring capabilities due to its elongated focus, whereas other methods, like LightFab, use a dot-like focus for full 3D structures. LIDE compensates for this with higher throughput, as a single pulse can modify the entire substrate thickness.
