= Doctors.net.uk =

Online community for doctors in the UK

Doctors.net.uk is an online closed community for doctors in the UK and one of the first of any networking sites to be introduced on the web.

Founded in 1998, by Dr Neil Bacon, the company offers a number of Web 2.0 features which allows doctors to communicate online – including email, a discussion forum, e-learning, medical podcasts and access to an online medical textbook and medical image library .

The company is funded by allowing communication from private companies (such as pharmaceutical companies) and government bodies (such as the NHS and Department of Health) to its members.

On the commercial side, it provides communication campaigns for pharmaceutical and healthcare companies, the Department of Health and other public sector organisations and medical colleges, providing them with effective access to doctors for marketing, education, training and market research.

The company, based in Milton Park, Oxfordshire, was acquired in August 2011 by the Tokyo listed M3 corporation, at which time it had over 180,000 doctor members. It now forms part of M3 Europe.

Doctors.net.uk is part of the M3 Group. M3 operates in Asia, the US and Europe with more than 1 million physician doctor members globally via M3.com, MDLinx, Medigate and Doctors.net.uk brands.

== News ==
In August 2008, a row over doctors' freedom of speech was erupted after a trainee doctor was suspended for making offensive comments about a senior medical figure on the Doctors.net.uk forum. The comments, allegedly about the re-election of Dame Carol Black as the chair of the Academy of Medical Royal Colleges – were made by a trainee in general surgery who was subsequently suspended from the Highland Deanery. Doctors.net.uk removed the offensive part of the posting as soon as it was alerted to it.

== Awards ==
In November 2008, Doctors.net.uk received a prestigious e-Learning Award for its work for the Department of Health (DH). The award, 'Best e-learning project securing widespread adoption' was a tribute to the work carried out by Doctors.net.uk in trying to reduce healthcare associated infections (HCAI) such as MRSA and C. difficile in UK hospitals.

In September 2008, Doctors.net.uk was included in the prestigious Sunday Times Tech Track 100, a list of Britain's fastest growing private technology companies – ranked 87th based upon steady sales growth of 42% per year during the past three years.

In 2007, it won the award for the Best Small Business IT Strategy at the Computing (magazine) Awards for Excellence, one of the most prestigious IT awards in the UK. Financial Times - Medicine may be one of Wap technology's 'killer' applications
