= Tokai Carbon =

Japanese chemicals and materials company

Tokai Carbon Co., Ltd.
- Company type: Public KK
- Traded as: TYO: 5301; Nikkei 225 Component
- Industry: Chemicals
- Founded: Tokyo, Japan (April 8, 1918; 108 years ago)
- Headquarters: Aoyama Building, Minato-ku, Tokyo 107-8636, Japan
- Key people: Hajime Nagasaka (CEO and President)
- Products: Carbon products; Industrial furnaces
- Revenue: ▲JP¥ 106.2 billion (FY 2017) (US$ 948 million) (FY 2017)
- Net income: ▲JP¥ 11.8 billion (FY 2017) (US$ 105 million) (FY 2017)
- Number of employees: 2,142 (consolidated, as of December 2016)
- Website: Official website

Tokai Carbon Co., Ltd. (東海カーボン株式会社, Tōkai Kābon Kabushiki-gaisha) is a Japanese company. The company is a developer and stockist of graphite material for use in nuclear power, particularly electrical discharge machining electrode, high temperature, and mechanical applications.

The company was founded in 1918 as Tokai Electrode Mfg. Co. Ltd. with a plant in Nagoya and the head office in Tokyo. In 1975 it changed to its present name, Tokai Carbon Co., Ltd. It is listed on the first section of the Tokyo Stock Exchange and is a constituent of the Nikkei 225 stock index.

== Company locations ==
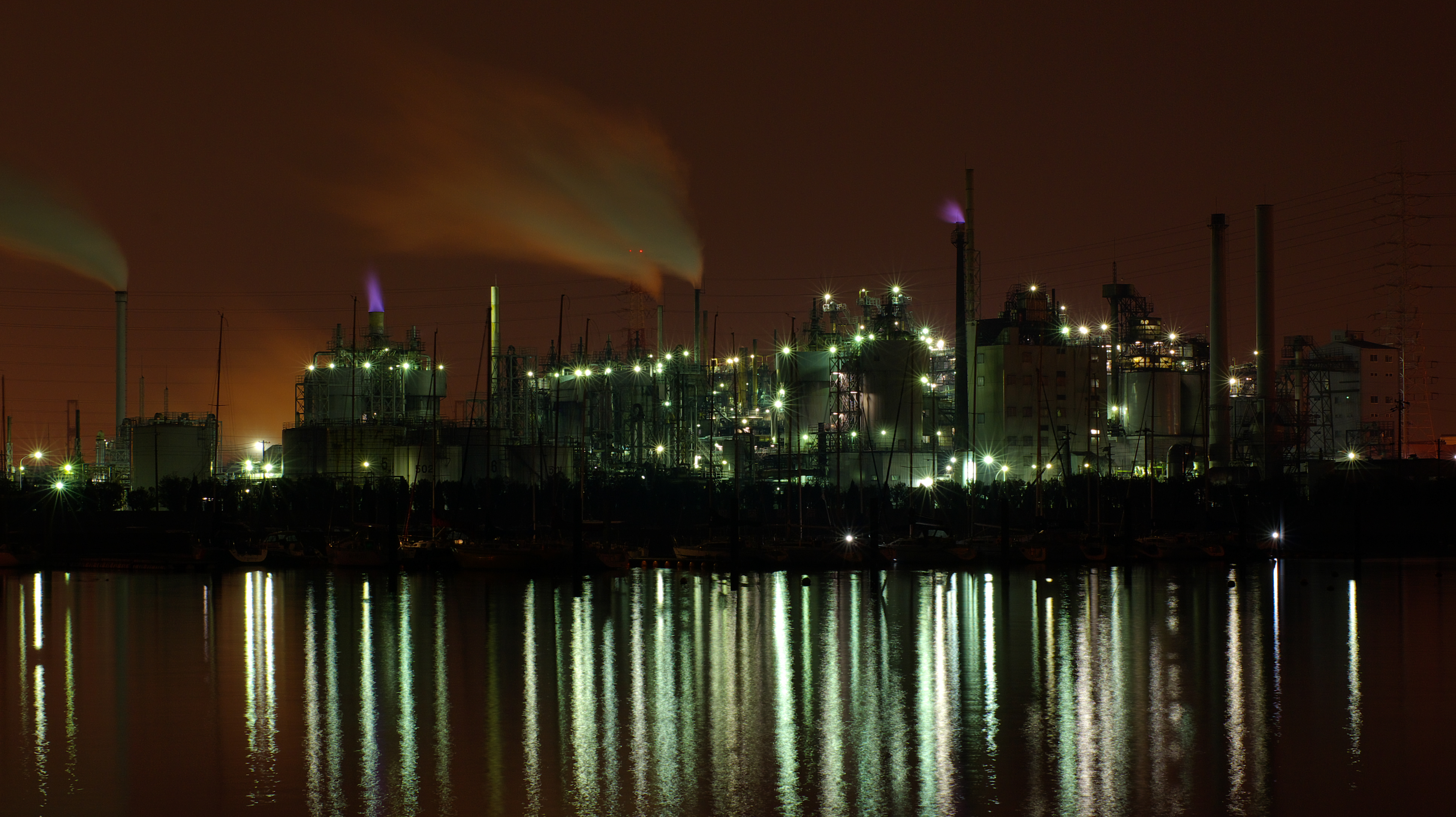
Night view of Tokai Carbon Chita factory

In Japan Tokai Carbon has:

- Manufacturing plants in Ishinomaki, Miyagi, Chigasaki, Kanagawa, Taketoyo, Aichi, Ōmihachiman, Shiga, Hōfu, Yamaguchi, Kitakyushu and Ashikita, Kumamoto
- Laboratories in Oyama, Shizuoka, Taketoyo (Aichi), Hōfu (Yamaguchi), Ashikita (Kumamoto) and Chigasaki (Kanagawa)
- Branch offices in Osaka, Nagoya and Fukuoka

As of the end of 2012 it has 24 subsidiaries and 6 affiliated companies in Japan, Germany, the UK, Sweden, Italy, China, Thailand, South Korea and the US.

== Acquisitions ==
In 2014 the company acquired Cancarb, a Canadian thermal carbon black producer, from TransCanada Corporation.

In June 2018 Tokai announced the acquisition of Sid Richardson Carbon, the largest manufacturer of furnace black in the US. Sid Richardson counts Bridgestone, Michelin, Goodyear and Continental AG among its customers.

== Business segments and products ==
- Carbon black for use in the tire (as a pigment and reinforcing agent for tires) and rubber industry
- Carbon and ceramics
  - Graphite electrodes, which are used for recycling steel in electric furnaces
  - Fine carbon, which is used in solar cell and semi-conductor industry
- Industrial furnaces and related products for fine ceramic, glass and electronic parts industry
- Other operations
  - Friction materials for use in the motorcycle, construction machinery and automobile industries (in brake and clutch systems)
  - Property leasing and operation of golf practice centers
