= Lasertec =

Japanese company

Lasertec Corporation
- Type: Public
- Industry: Semiconductor industry
- Founded: 1960; 66 years ago
- Headquarters: Yokohama, Japan
- Key people: Tetsuya Sendoda (CEO)
- Products: Measurement devices, Optical instruments
- Revenue: ¥214 billion (US$1.95 billion) (2024)
- Number of employees: 1,017 (2024)
- Website: www.lasertec.co.jp/en/

Lasertec Corporation is a Japanese company based in Yokohama that specializes in the development, manufacture and distribution of inspection and measurement systems used primarily in the semiconductor industry. In its niche, the company is the global market leader. Lasertec pursues a fabless strategy and outsources production to subcontractors, allowing it to concentrate on research and development. Lasertec's shares are listed on the Tokyo Stock Exchange and are included in the Nikkei 225 index.

== History ==
The company was founded in 1960 as Tokyo ITV Laboratory, and started out developing and designing X-ray cameras for specialized medical equipment. In the 1970s, the company began to expand into inspection systems for photolithography in the semiconductor industry. In 1979, a branch was opened in San Mateo and in 1980 in Düsseldorf. In 1986, the company was renamed Lasertec Corporation and Lasertec U.S.A., Inc. was founded as an American subsidiary in San José. In 2004, the company's shares were listed on the Jasdaq Shōken Torihikijo and in 2012 a secondary listing was made on the Tokyo Stock Exchange.

In 2017, an inspection system for EUV (extreme ultraviolet lithography) masks was unveiled. Lasertec was the first company worldwide to offer such a product commercially. The associated lithography machines are manufactured by the Dutch company ASML and Lasertec's measurement systems are used to check whether the manufactured semiconductors are ready for production, giving Lasertec a global monopoly in this niche of the semiconductor industry.

In 2020, Lasertec won Intels annual supplier award.

In 2022, the company announced the construction of the Lasertec Innovation Park in Yokohama as a new research and development center.

Thanks to the global AI boom, Lasertec's shares rose by almost 1800 percent between 2019 and 2024, which is why Lasertec was included in the Nikkei 225 index in 2023. This rise in the share price made Lasertec the most traded stock on the Tokyo Stock Exchange.

In July 2024, the short-seller Scorpion Capital accused the company of fraudulent behavior. The announced next-generation EUV product would be a "hoax" and the announced new research and development facility actually deserted.

== Products ==
Lasertec Corporation designs and markets specialized measurement and inspection instruments. These systems are used primarily in the semiconductor industry to ensure the quality of EUV masks, wafers and other components. Lasertec also develops inspection systems for photomasks used in the production of flat-panel displays and laser microscopes.

== Subsidiaries ==
- Lasertec U.S.A., Inc. (with branches in Ireland, Germany and Israel)
- Lasertec Korea Corp.
- Lasertec Taiwan, Inc.
- Lasertec China Co., Ltd.
- Lasertec Singapore Pte. Ltd.
