= Comsys =

Japanese telecommunications construction and engineering company

COMSYS Holdings Corporation
- Native name: コムシスホールディングス株式会社
- Type: Public (K.K)
- Traded as: TYO: 1721; Nikkei 225 Component
- ISIN: JP3305530002
- Industry: Construction; Engineering
- Founded: September 23, 2003; 23 years ago
- Headquarters: Higashigotanda, Shinagawa-ku, Tokyo 141-8647, Japan
- Key people: Takashi Kagaya (President)
- Services: Telecommunication facility construction; Telecommunications engineering
- Revenue: ▲JPY 481.7 billion (FY 2017) (US$ 4.3 billion)
- Net income: ▲JPY 28 billion (FY 2017) (US$ 254 million)
- Number of employees: 11,581 (consolidated, as of March 31, 2018)
- Website: Official website

Comsys Holdings Corporation (コムシスホールディングス株式会社, Komushisu Hōrudingusu Kabushiki-gaisha) is a Japanese construction company, specializing in telecommunication facility construction and engineering. It is a constituent of the Nikkei 225 stock market index.

== Renewable energy ==
The company designed and built a 4.87-MW solar plant in the prefecture of Kyoto for Lixil Group that was launched on September 1, 2015. A year later Comsys started the operation of a floating solar power plant on a reservoir in Kato City, Hyogo Prefecture.
