= T&D Holdings =

Japanese insurance company

T&D Holdings logo

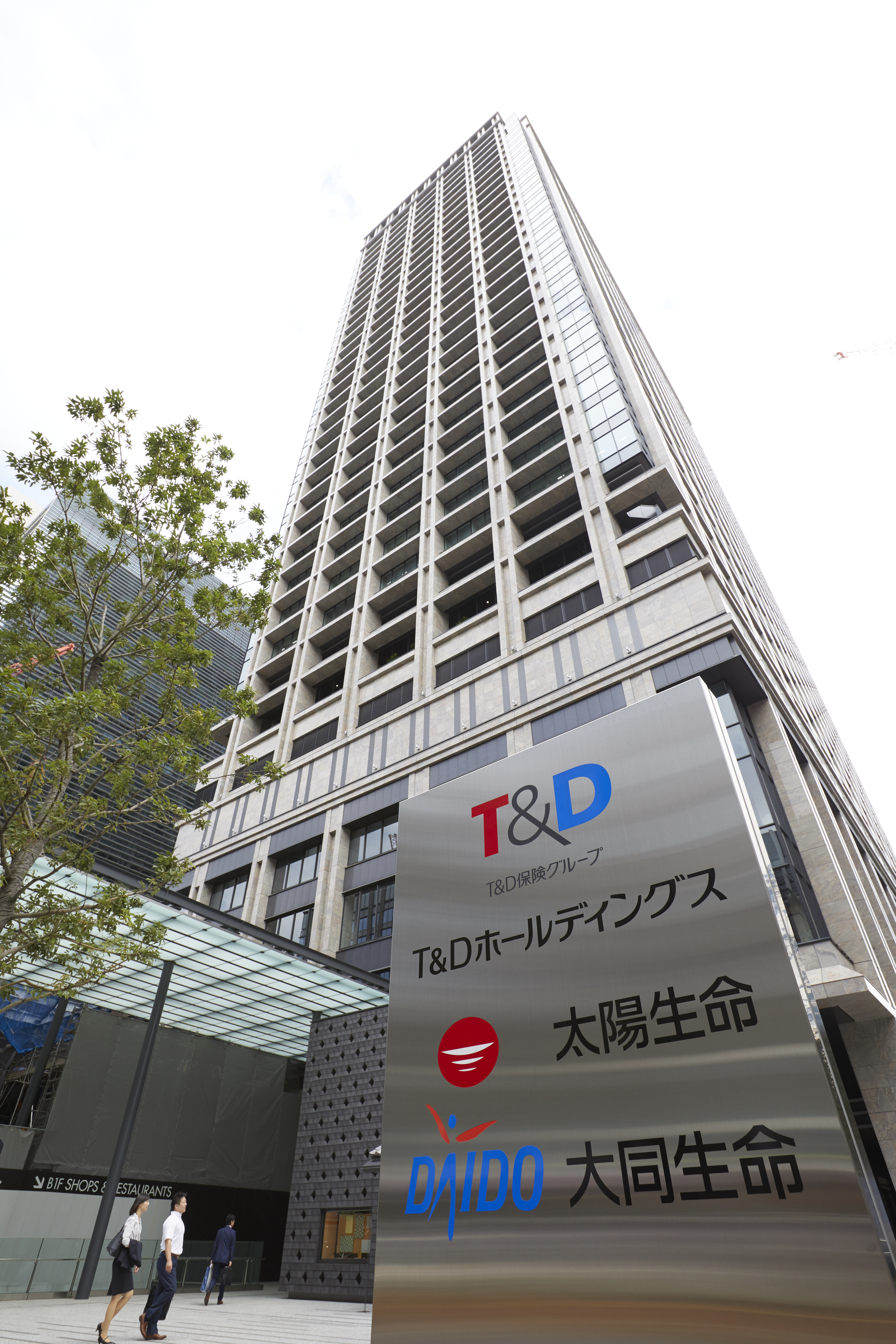
T&D Holdings

T&D Holdings is a Japanese insurance company. It is listed on the Nikkei 225. It is based in Tokyo, Japan. Subsidiaries include Taiyo Life, Daido Life, T&D Financial Life, and T&D Asset Management.

In 2012, it was ranked 413 in the Fortune Global 500 list, with US$26.6bn in revenue. Assets — $123.7 billion (2015).
