= Nisshin Seifun Group =

Japanese food manufacturing company

Nisshin Seifun Group Inc.

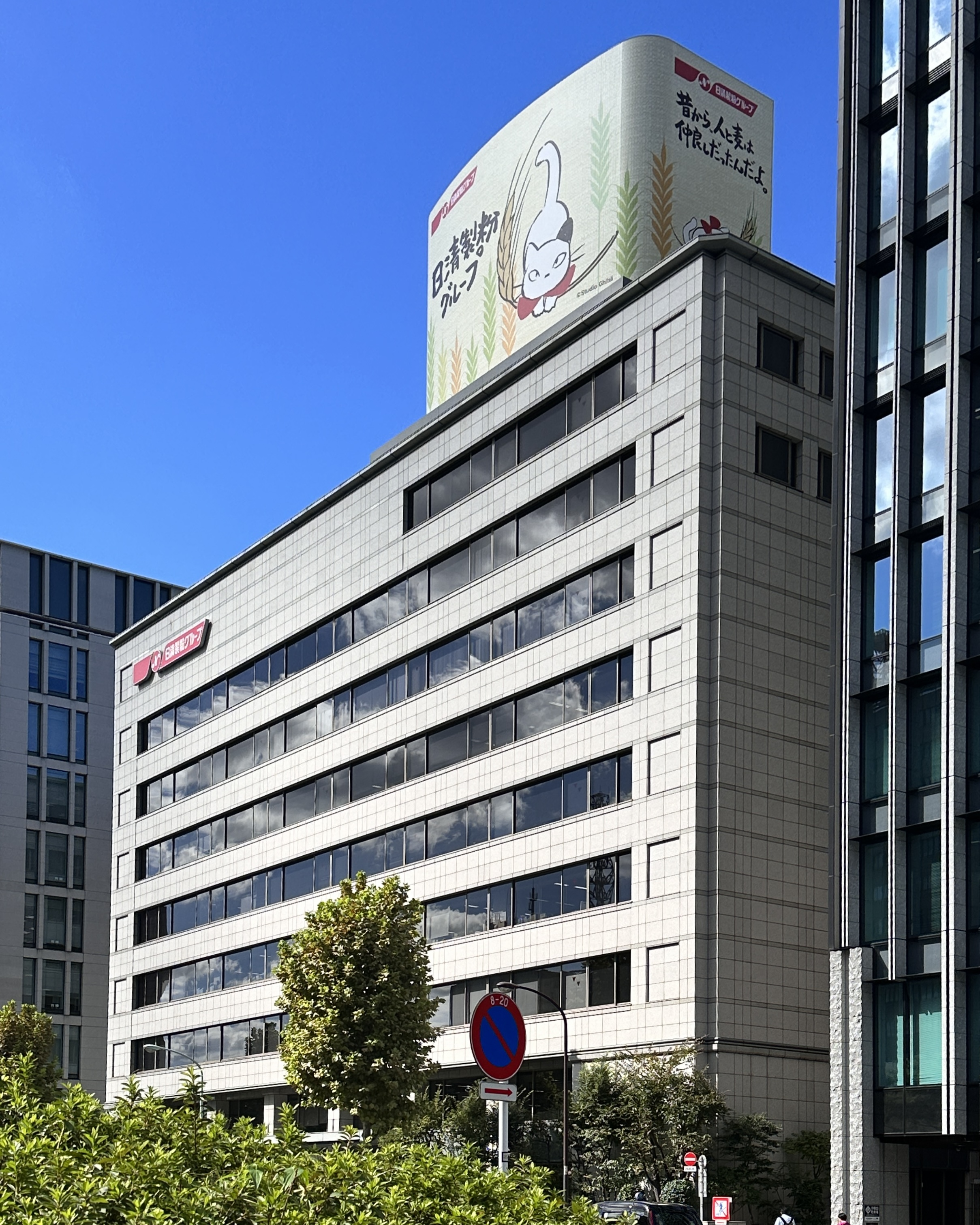
- Headquarters in Kanda-Nishikichō, Chiyoda, Tokyo
- Company type: Public (K.K)
- Traded as: TYO: 2002
- Industry: Food manufacturing
- Founded: October 1900; 125 years ago Tatebayashi Flour Milling Co., Ltd. (Tatebayashi Seifun)
- Founder: Teiichiro Shoda (正田貞一郎)
- Headquarters: 25, Kanda-Nishiki-cho 1-chome, Chiyoda-ku, Tokyo, Japan
- Key people: Osamu Shoda (chairman); Hiroshi Oeda (president)
- Website: https://www.nisshin.com/

Nisshin Seifun Group Inc. (株式会社日清製粉グループ本社, Kabushikigaisha Nisshin Seifun Gurūpu Honsha) is a Japanese food manufacturing company headquartered in Chiyoda-ku, Tokyo, Japan with overseas operations. Nisshin Seifun is listed on the Nikkei 225.

Founded in 1900, the company is currently headed by chairman Osamu Shoda, the younger brother of Empress Michiko, and president Hiroshi Oeda.

== Subsidiaries ==
Subsidiary of Nisshin Seifun Group include:

- Nisshin Flour Milling Company
- Nisshin Seifun Welna Inc
- Nisshin Pharma Inc
- Nisshin Petfoods Inc
- Nisshin Engineering Inc
- Oriental Yeast Company Limited
- NBC Meshtec Inc — screen-printing materials, mesh products
- Initio Food Inc — ready to eat foods
- Rogers Foods Ltd. — milled products; plants in Armstrong and Chilliwack, Canada
- Allied Pinnacle, Australia.

== Operations ==
Nisshin Seifun has operations outside Japan:

- Germany - offices
- Canada - production plants
- US - offices and production plants
- China - offices and production plants
- Thailand - production plants
- Netherlands - offices
- New Zealand - production plants
- Indonesia - offices
- Australia - offices, mills and bakeries

== Trademarks ==
Nisshin Seifun holds the Welna trademark.
