= Tokyu Land =

Japanese real estate company

Tokyu Fudosan Holdings Corporation
- Trade name: Tokyu Fudosan
- Native name: 東急不動産ホールディングス株式会社
- Romanized name: Tōkyū Fudosan kabushiki-gaisha
- Company type: Public K.K.
- Traded as: TYO: 3289; Nikkei 225 component
- Industry: Conglomerate
- Founded: October 1, 2013; 12 years ago
- Founder: Keita Goto
- Headquarters: 1-21-1 Dogenzaka, Shibuya-ku, Tokyo (〒150-0043 東京都渋谷区道玄坂1丁目21番1号 渋谷ソラスタ), Japan
- Area served: Japan
- Key people: Hironori Nishikawa(chairman); Hiroaki Hoshino (President & CEO)
- Services: Real estate
- Owner: Tokyu Corporation (15.90%); Chiba Kōgyō Bank (0.06%); Tokyu Recreation (0.04%)
- Parent: Tokyu Group
- Subsidiaries: Tokyu Livable; Tokyu Hands; Tokyu Recreation
- Website: www.tokyu-fudosan-hd.co.jp

Tokyu Land is a major real estate development company headquartered in Dogenzaka, Shibuya-ku, Tokyo, Japan. It is listed on the Nikkei 225.
