= Nippon Electric Glass =

Japanese glass manufacturer

Nippon Electric Glass Co., Ltd.
- Logo used since 2022

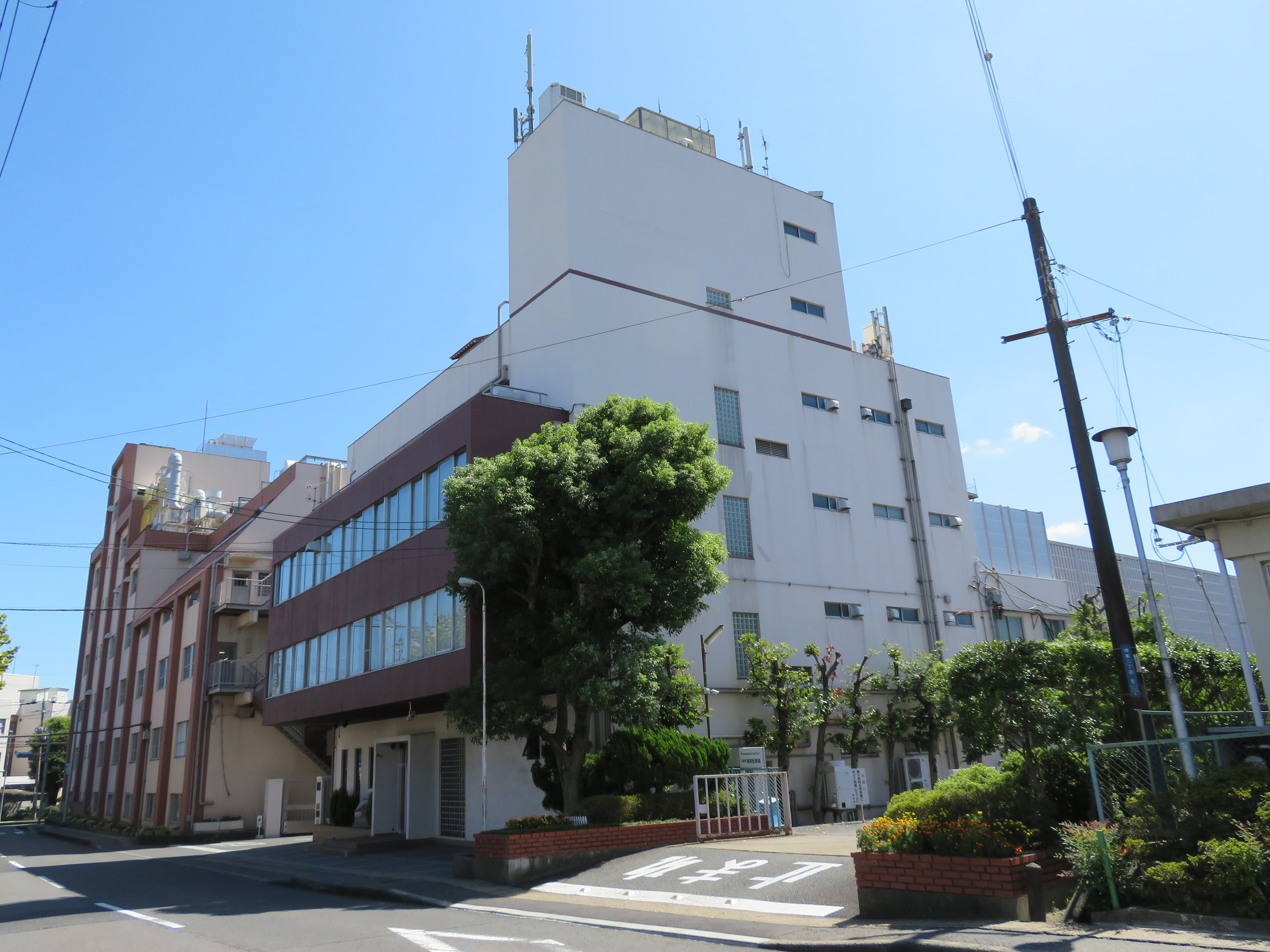
- Headquarters in Seiran, Otsu
- Native name: 日本電気硝子株式会社
- Romanized name: Nippon Denki Garasu Kabushiki-gaisha
- Type: Public KK
- Traded as: TYO: 5214; Nikkei 225 Component
- Industry: Glass
- Founded: December 1, 1949; 76 years ago
- Headquarters: 7-1, Seiran 2-chome, Ōtsu, Shiga, Japan
- Key people: Motoharu Matsumoto (Chairman of the Board); Akira Kishimoto (President)
- Products: Glass products; Glassmaking machinery
- Revenue: ▼¥279.974 billion (2023)
- Net income: ▼¥26.285 billion (2023)
- Number of employees: 5,578
- Website: www.neg.co.jp/en/

Nippon Electric Glass Co., Ltd. (日本電気硝子株式会社, Nippon Denki Garasu Kabushiki-gaisha), also known as NEG, is a Japanese glass manufacturer. The company is a manufacturer of glass for flat panel displays (FPD). It has about 20% share in the world's production of glass for liquid crystal displays (LCD).

The company is listed on the Tokyo Stock Exchange and is a constituent of the Nikkei 225 stock index.

== History ==
- 1944: Established with investment from NEC Corporation and other companies.
- 1949: Separated from NEC, and Nippon Electric Glass was founded as an independent company.
- 1951: Successfully began use of the Danner process to form glass tubing automatically; initiated mass production.
- 1956: Started continuous production of glass tubing using a tank furnace.
- 1965: Started production of black-and-white CRT glass.
- 1968: Started production of color CRT glass.
- 1973: Company stock listed on the Tokyo Stock Exchange (TSE) and Osaka Securities Exchange (OSE) (Second Section).
- 1974: Started production of thin sheet glass for LCDs.
- 1983: Company stock transferred to the First Section of the TSE and OSE.
- 1988: Started CRT glass operations in the US via joint venture with O-I Glass. (Techneglas)
- 1998: Started production of PDP substrate glass using the float process.
- 1999: Acquired ISO 14001 certification for all plants in Japan.
- 1999: Started production of LCD substrate glass by the overflow process.
- 2004: Ended CRT glass production in the US and Mexico.
- 2010: Started production of substrate glass for solar cells.
- 2017: Acquired three of the largest fiberglass factories in the world from PPG, the largest of which being in Shelby, North Carolina, US.

== Products ==
=== Glass for display devices ===
- Glass for Liquid Crystal Displays (LCDs)
  - Substrate glass for LCDs
  - Glass tubing for cold cathode fluorescent lamps (CCFL)
  - Cell spacing for LCDs (micro rods)
- Glass for Plasma Display Panels (PDPs)
  - Substrate glass for PDPs
  - Glass pastes for PDPs
  - Glass for exhaust tubes, tablets, and firing setters
- Glass for CRTs
  - Panel glass for CRTs
  - CRT neck tubes, stem tubes, and exhaust tubes

=== Glass for electronic devices ===
- Powder glass
- Cover glass for image sensors
- Glass for diodes
- Glass for laser diodes
- Glass for optical devices
  - Glass ferrules and micro capillaries for optical connectors
  - Glass material for aspherical lenses
  - Collimator components
  - Micro prisms
  - Coupler housing

=== Glass fiber ===
- Chopped strands for function plastics
- Yarns for printed circuit boards
- Roving for reinforced plastic
- Alkali resistant glass fiber

=== Building materials, heat-resistant glass ===
- Glass for building materials
  - Glass blocks
  - Glass-ceramic building materials
  - Fire-rated glass
  - Radiation shielding glass
- Heat-resistant glass
  - Super heat-resistant glass-ceramic
  - Super heat-resistant glass-ceramic for cooking appliance top plates
  - Heat-resistant glass
- Glass for lighting and medical use
  - Glass for lighting
  - Glass for medical and laboratory applications
  - Glass for thermos flasks
