= Shift Inc. =

- Native name: 株式会社Shift
- Romanized name: Kabushiki-gaisha Shift
- Type: Public (K.K.)
- Traded as: TYO: 3697
- Industry: Software testing
- Founded: September 7, 2005; 20 years ago in Shibuya, Tokyo, Japan
- Founder: Masaru Tange
- Headquarters: Minato, Tokyo, Japan
- Number of locations: 5 offices Tokyo, Sapporo, Fukuoka, Nagoya, Osaka (2020)
- Key people: Masaru Tange (President and CEO)
- Products: CAT (Test management system)
- Revenue: ¥28,712,177 thousand (FY 2020)
- Operating income: ¥2,353,376 thousand (FY 2020)
- Net income: ¥1,892,893 thousand (FY 2020)
- Total assets: ¥19,821,109 thousand (FY 2020)
- Total equity: ¥10,781,494 thousand (FY 2020)
- Owner: Masaru Tange (36.27%)
- Number of employees: 6,013 (August 2020)
- Subsidiaries: Shift Asia (Vietnam); ALH Inc. (Japan); and others
- Website: Official website (English); Official website (Japanese)

Shift Inc. (Japanese: 株式会社Shift, Hepburn: Kabushiki-gaisha Shift) is a Japanese software testing company, headquartered in Tokyo, that provides software quality assurance and software testing solutions.

== Overview ==
Shift Inc. was founded in 2005 by Masaru Tange, who was a manufacturing process improvement consultant. In the earliest years, it was a tiny consulting company specializing in manufacturing and business process improvements. In 2007, it entered the software testing industry by undertaking consultancy work for the improvement of E-commerce testing. In 2009, Tange changed the company's direction from the process improvement consultancy to the software testing business. The company then grew rapidly and was listed on the Tokyo Stock Exchange Mothers market in 2014. In April 2020, it had a market capitalization of 143 billion yen ($1.3 billion), which was the largest of the listed Japanese companies specialized in software quality assurance and testing services. (Note: The market capitalizations of other listed Japanese software testing companies as of April 2020 are 32 billion yen of Poletowin Pitcrew Holdings (TYO: 3657), 19 billion yen of Digital Hearts Holdings (TYO: 3676), and 9 billion yen of Valtes (TYO: 4442).)

The company covers software testing outsourcing, project management office and test strategy planning supports, test execution, test design, automated testing, software inspection, and educational program services.
