= Haseko =

Japanese construction company

Haseko Corporation
- Native name: 株式会社 長谷工コーポレーション
- Company type: Public (K.K)
- Traded as: TYO: 1808; Nikkei 225 Component
- ISIN: JP3768600003
- Industry: Construction; Real Estate; Engineering
- Founded: February 1937, 11; 89 years ago in Amagasaki, Japan
- Founder: Takehiko Hasegawa
- Headquarters: Shiba, Minato-ku, Tokyo 105-8507, Japan
- Key people: Noriaki Tsuji (President)
- Services: Civil engineering; Condominium construction; Real estate services; Building renovation; Management of paid care housing for the elderly
- Revenue: ▼JPY 772.3 billion (FY 2016) (US$ 7.1 billion) (FY 2016)
- Net income: ▲JPY 58.7 billion (FY 2016) (US$ 542.6 million) (FY 2016)
- Number of employees: 6,602 (consolidated, as of March 31, 2017)
- Website: Official website

Haseko Corporation (株式会社 長谷工コーポレーション, Kabushiki-gaisha Hasekō Kōporēshon) is a Japanese construction company specialized in construction of condominium units. From 1968 to 2015, the company built a total of around 580,000 condominium units, which is approximately 10% of the total number of condominium units on the market in Japan.

The company is highly vertically integrated, with all of the lifecycle of condominium construction and maintenance handled by the company or its subsidiaries.

On October 1, 2015, Haseko Corporation was included in the Nikkei 225 stock market index.
