= Price-weighted index =

Proportionally weighted stock market index

A price-weighted index is a stock market index where each constituent makes up a fraction of the index that is proportional to its price. A stock trading at $100 will thus make up 10 times more of the weight of the total index compared to a stock trading at $10.

The Dow Jones Industrial Average and Nikkei 225 are commonly given as examples of price-weighted stock market indexes, although the Nikkei is not a "pure" price-weighted index.

Unlike a market-cap weight index, which selects stocks automatically by market capitalization, a price-weighted index will need some alternative method of stock selection. For example, the Nikkei 225 constituents are selected by committee, taking into account liquidity (high trading volume) and representativeness of market sectors.

To be meaningful, a price-weighted index will need some way of adjusting for shares outstanding. For example, two companies with the same market cap may have very different share prices purely because they have issued different numbers of shares, even if the companies differ in no other way. The Nikkei 225 adjusts each price by an "adjustment factor" to ensure that no stock represents more than 1% of the index.

== See also ==
- Fundamentally based indexes
- Capitalization-weighted index
