= MDLinx =

Internet-based service for physicians and healthcare professionals

- Owner: M3 USA Corporation
- Website: www.mdlinx.com
- Commercial: Yes
- Registration: Required
- Launched: 1999; 27 years ago
- Current status: Online
- Content license: Proprietary

M3 USA Corporation
- Formerly: MDLinx, Inc.
- Industry: Internet-based service
- Founded: 1999 in United States
- Founder: Evan Garfein, Robert Ashton
- Headquarters: Fort Washington, Pennsylvania, U.S.
- Brands: MDLinx; PracticeMatch; Smartest Doc; M3 Global Research
- Owner: M3, Inc.
- Website: usa.m3.com

MDLinx is an internet-based service for physicians and healthcare professionals provided by M3 USA Corporation. It offers physicians and other healthcare professionals a means of staying current with academic literature. The typical medical specialist needs to read 30 to 80 journal articles every day to keep up with the flow of information in their specialty. MDLinx scans, sorts, summarizes, and disseminates new literature in a digestible form.

Healthcare professionals subscribe to the free service and opt to receive daily or weekly newsletters with summaries of and links to new journal articles in their areas of specialty. MDLinx users also receive information about pharmaceuticals and Continuing Medical Education (CME) programs, and invitations to take part in paid market research surveys. MDLinx currently runs sites in 34 specialties and 747 subspecialties. Clients, which include pharmaceutical companies and Continuing Medical Education (CME) institutions, use informational and promotional space on MDLinx's site and email to communicate information about their products, services and programs. MDLinx's Market Research arm provides direct access to physician panels in the US, Japan and Korea, and access via partnerships to physician panels in other countries. According to Forrester Research, MDLinx is one of the most trafficked physician portals in the United States.

== History ==
Founding

MDLinx was founded in 1999 by Evan Garfein, a surgical resident at Brigham and Women's Hospital in Boston, and Robert Ashton, a cardiothoracic surgical fellow at Columbia-Presbyterian. The surgeons saw a need for specialists to have access to information that was applicable to their fields. Alan Meckler, founder of high tech news publisher Mecklermedia and chief executive officer of venture capital firm Internet.com provided the upfront investment and Mehmet Oz, cardiothoracic surgeon and author, served on the Board of Directors. MDLinx was the first physician portal to offer an index of over a thousand journals segmented into over seven hundred subspecialties. In early 2006, MDLinx was credited with linking a doctor to a Mongolian boy in need of a heart operation.

Merger

In 2006, MDLinx was fully acquired by So-net M3 USA (currently M3 USA), a wholly owned subsidiary of So-net M3 (currently M3, Inc. (TYO: 2413)), a leading provider of online marketing solutions to the healthcare industry in Japan and an affiliate of Sony Communication Network Corporation (currently Sony Network Communications Inc.). Currently, Sony Corporation indirectly owns 39.4% of M3 USA. The company and its services including MDLinx are independently operated from Sony. With the merger, MDLinx expanded its offerings to healthcare professionals to include information on new drugs and CME programs.

In February 2009, MDLinx announced its acceptance into CASRO, the Council of American Survey Research Organizations, the industry's leading quality benchmark. MDLinx currently has a patent pending for the way feasibility is calculated and market research is conducted on the internet.
