= Yamao Yōzō =

Japanese samurai engineer (1837-1917)

- 山尾 庸三
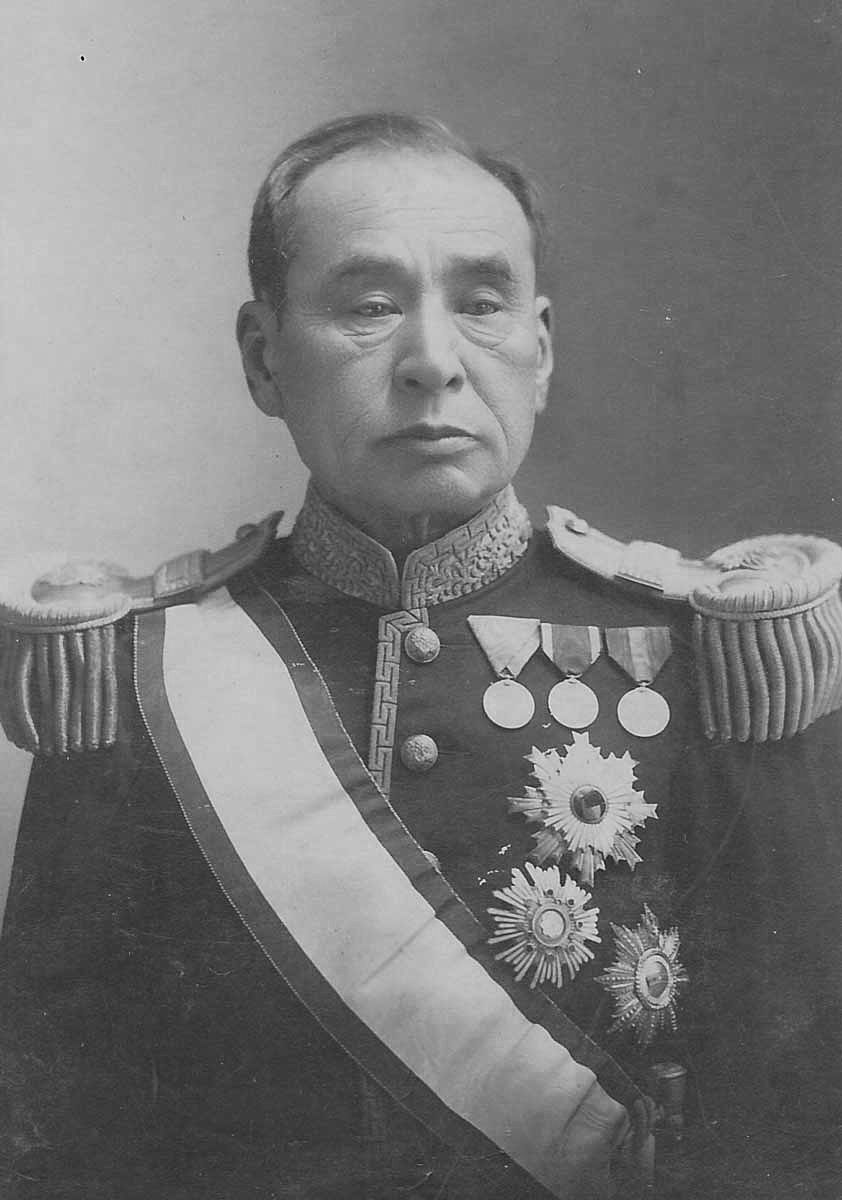
- Viscount Yamao Yōzō

Director-General of the Legislative Bureau
- In office 23 December 1885 – 7 February 1888
- Prime Minister: Itō Hirobumi
- Preceded by: Office established
- Succeeded by: Inoue Kowashi

Lord of Public Works
- In office 28 February 1880 – 21 October 1881
- Monarch: Meiji
- Preceded by: Yamada Akiyoshi
- Succeeded by: Sasaki Takayuki

Personal details
- Born: 5 November 1837 Yoshiki, Suō, Japan
- Died: 21 December 1917 (aged 80) Roppongi, Tokyo, Japan
- Relatives: Kōichi Kido (grandson)
- Education: University College, London; Andersonian Institute

Viscount Yamao Yōzō (山尾 庸三; 5 November 1837 – 21 December 1917) was a Japanese samurai of the late Edo period who became an influential member of the Meiji era government of Japan.

== Early life ==
Yamao was born in Aio-Futajima, a village in Chōshū domain (present day Yamaguchi prefecture), and received a traditional training as a Samurai. He was eager to learn science, and entered the Egawa School in Edo, then continued studying under Takeda Hishisaburo, a samurai engineer at Hakodate. In the end of 1862, he joined extremist group of Chōshū domain, and set fire to newly completed British Legation building on Gotenyama. Five of the young Choshu samurais, so called Chōshū Five soon left Japan for London from Nagasaki to study western knowledge in 1863 with help of Thomas Blake Glover.

== Studies and training in Britain ==
Before being able to study at the University College London, the members of the Choshu Five studied English for a year. Two of his colleagues Itō Hirobumi and Inoue Kaoru returned to Japan to try and stop Chōshū domain going to war with the Western powers, but Yamao and two other remained and studied science and industry at University College London. After two years, Yamao moved to Glasgow to receive technical training at Napier's shipyard on the Clyde. He lived in the home of Colin Brown, a friend of Hugh Matheson, and attended evening classes at Anderson's College (now the University of Strathclyde). Henry Dyer also attended the college and said he saw Yamao, although they did not become personally acquainted at that time. Brown remembered that Yamao worked hard everyday from early in the morning for future of Japan at Glasgow, and could not help but call Yamao a "real hero" when he was informed that Yamao took a position of responsibility in the Meiji government by C.A. McVean.

== Return to Japan ==
Soon after the Meiji Restoration took place, Yamao returned to Japan and joined the new Meiji government. He first took charge of the Yokosuka Shipyard (former Yokosuka Arsenal) and Yokohama Iron-works. Meanwhile Edmund Morel, a chief engineer for railway construction, proposed the new government to found the Ministry of Public Works, and Ito Hirobumi and Yamao endeavoured to create the new ministry. As Morel emphasised importance of engineering education and Colin Alexander McVean advised Yamao to set up survey department, Yamao successfully added these two departments into the new ministry in September 1871. After Morel died in October 1871, Yamao had to find new advisor for establishment of the engineering college, and eventually contacted Hugh Matheson again through good offices of McVean. Matheson kindly arranged appointment of teaching staff for the college led by Henry Dyer through his connection with Lewis Gordon, William Rankine and William Thomson. Before arriving to Japan in June 1873, Dyer arranged calendar and syllabus for the engineering college on the board, which was accepted by Yamao without any revision. Yamao successfully established the college, which was officially renamed the Imperial College of Engineering in 1877. He also set up a school for the blind and deaf and is said to have introduced the idea of sign language to Japan.

Yamao was elevated to the rank of shishaku (viscount) in the kazoku peerage system.

== Auld Lang Syne ==
Colin Brown was Euing Lecturer of Music in the Andersonian College, and compiled "Songs of Scotland: New Symphonies and Accompaniments (1873)" together with J. Pittman, "Auld Langsyne" on page 21. Yamao has surely used to listen to this song at Colin Brown's home and it is possible that Yamao introduced Auld Lang Syne to Japan where it is called Hotaru no Hikari (The Light of the Fireflies) and is sung at high school graduation ceremonies.

== Reference and further reading ==
- Beasley, W. G. The Meiji Restoration. Stanford: Stanford University Press, 1972.
- Cobbing, Andrew. The Japanese Discovery of Victorian Britain. RoutledgeCurzon, London, 1998. ISBN 1-873410-81-6
- Craig, Albert M. Chōshū in the Meiji Restoration. Cambridge: Harvard University Press, 1961.
