= Colin Alexander McVean =

Scottish civil engineer (1838–1912)

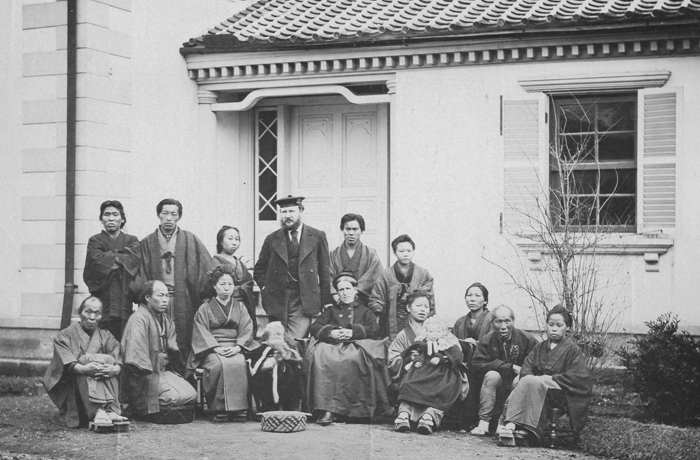
Mcvean Family and servants in Tokyo, 1872.

Colin Alexander McVean, FRGS (6 March 1838 – 18 January 1912) was a Scottish civil engineer who contributed to Japan's engineering development in 1870s. He left two brief autobiographies, diaries, photos, letters and a collection of Japanese antiques.

== Early life and career ==
He was born the first son of The Reverend Donald McVean, minister of the Free Church of Iona and Mull.

After a five-year apprenticeship at Edinburgh, he joined the Hydrographic Office, Admiralty, and was engaged in a survey of the Hebrides under the direction of Captain Henry Charles Otter during 1861-64. He worked together with William Maxwell, RN, Henry Scharbau and W.E. Cheesman.

In 1865-66, he worked for railway construction at Bulgaria.

In June, just before departure to Japan, he married Mary Wood Cowan, youngest daughter of Alexander Cowan, a paper-maker in Penicuik. Marriage witness were Archibald Constable and Campbell Douglas.

== Appointment in Japan ==
McVean was informed by his friend that the Northern Lighthouse Board of Edinburgh was recruiting several engineers for lighthouse construction in Japan in February 1868. It was too late to apply for the Chief Engineer's post, and McVean was appointed as Assistant Engineer together with A.W. Blundell. The chief engineer was Henry Brunton.

The first lighthouse construction on Mikomoto-Jima in March to June 1869 was a difficult project, as Japanese masons were not familiar with western construction methods. McVean asked Brunton for revisions to the construction scheme, but Brunton's response was unsatisfactory and McVean made up his mind to resign from the Lighthouse Office together with Blundell, and started engineering business at Yokohama under the name of Vulcan Foundry.

He met Yamao Yozo, government officer in charge of Yokosuma Arsenal and Yokohama Ironwork at Yokohama, and became close friends with him in both private life and business, as they have had common experience and friends in Scotland. McVean soon encouraged Yamao to establish a survey office to make nationwide geodetic survey.

Meanwhile, the Meiji government decided to establish the Ministry of Public Works (Japan) on 12 December 1870 by the advice of Edmund Morel, Chief Engineer of Railway Construction in order to achieve rapid social and industrial development. After long discussions among the Cabinet members, on 28 September 1871 the government finally established the Public Works Ministry, consisting of 11 departments: railroads, shipyards, lighthouses, mines, an iron and steel industry, telecommunication, civil works, manufacturing, industrial promotion, an Engineering education institution and survey. Yamao headed the Engineering Institution and Survey Office, and placed McVean into chief surveyor position for surveying and building.

=== Chief Surveyor of Public Works and Home Office ===
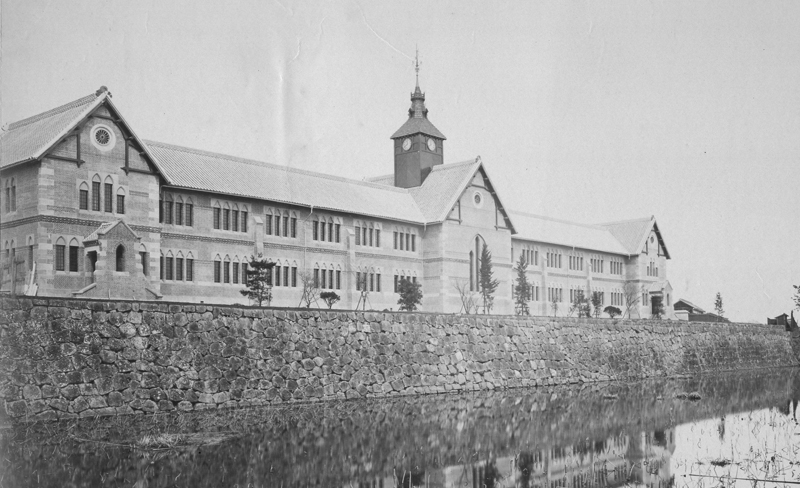
Engineering college building designed and built by McVean and Joyner, completed in 1874.

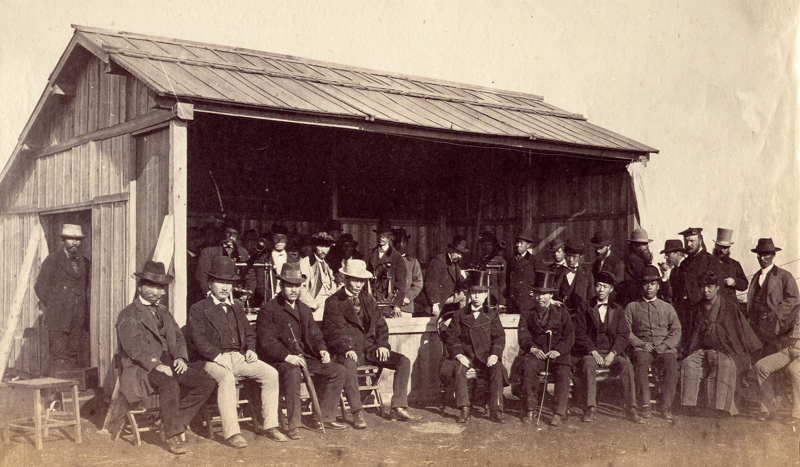
Venus Transit Observation, directed by McVean on Gotenyama in December 1874.

==== Building Work ====
Engineering College Buildings: McVean was appointed as a chief surveyor for the Survey Department and extensively assisted Yamao, who had to head both the Survey and Engineering Institution. Morel and Yamao rushed to open the engineering college, but Morel died in October 1871. While McVean concentrated to design and construct the college buildings together with Henry Batson Joyner, he endeavoured to reunite Yamao with Hugh Matheson via Colin Brown. Matheson kindly arranged appointment of teaching staff for the engineering college through his connection, Lewis Gordon, William Rankine and William Thompson (Lord Kelvin).

McVean asked Campbell Douglas, a prominent architect in Glasgow, to send building materials and a young architect to Japan in 1872. Charles Alfred Chastel de Boinville, Anglo-French architect aged 23 arrived at Tokyo in the end of 1872.

Ginza Redevelopment Scheme: In March 1872, big fire took place in downtown area of Tokyo, and McVean arranged redevelopment scheme by order of Yamao.

Design of Government Officers' Residence: He prepared plan of official residences for Sanjō Sanetomi, Yamao, etc.

==== Surveying ====
Survey School: McVean started in his duty from setting up the survey school hiring two instructor; Richard Rymer Jones and George Eaton

Former Castle Site: In May 1872, Yamao ordered McVean to survey the former Caste site, in which new Imperial palace was to be constructed.

Appointment of Surveyors: Cosmo Innes a chief of British India's Public Works at the time, sent McVean 3 surveyors. McVean invited Henry Scharbau and W.E. Cheesman, both McVean's friends during the Hydrographic Office period.

Setting up of Triangular Survey: After returned from the Britain with new instruments in May 1874, he directed nationwide triangular survey.

==== Meteorological Astrological and Seismic Observation ====
Purchase of Instruments: McVean discussed extent of the function of the Survey Office with Yamao, when returned home to purchase various instruments in February 1873. Under the name of Yamao, he requested assistant to the Scottish Meteorological Society to start up observations including selection and setting up of instruments, observation manners, positioning of observation, role of central observatory and stations, seismic observation, special observation of typhoon, reference books. According to the Memorandum with the Society, McVean bought various instruments from the Casella Co., survey and astrological instruments from Troughton & Simms, and seismic instruments from Luigi Palmieri. In September 1873, McVean and Schaubau visited the Royal Observatory at Charlton to learn how to observe Venus Transit from James Simms.

Observation of Venus Transit: On 4 December 1874 McVean successfully made official observation of the Venus Transit on Gotenyama in present of Sanjo Sanetomi, Ito Hirobumi, etc.

Meteorology: Each of the numbers of Mr. McVean's publication gave the tri-daily observations of the various meteorological elements for five days, beginning with 2 December 1875.

==== Dismissal and life in Tokyo ====
The Public Works released the Survey Office to newly founded Home Office in January 1874. The minister Ōkubo Toshimichi had a negative idea about the appointment of foreign officers and dismissed high ranking foreign officers including McVean, Richard Henry Brunton (Lighthouse) and Murray Day (Hokaido Development Agency) in 1876.

John Francis Campbell visited: Campbell of Isley was a friends of Reverend Donald McVean, and stayed at McVean's residence of Tokyo in November 1874. McVean took Campbell to several places around Tokyo including Nikko. Campbell walked along Nakasendō Post-way through Lake Suwa and Lake Biwa toward Kyoto for 2 months, and left Japan from Kobe to next destination.

Sending Bird Skins to Henry Eeles Dresser: Dresser got interested in McVean's research on "On the Ornithology of Yedo (Tokyo)", asked McVean to send bird skins to London.

== Back home and retirement ==
After working at several places as an engineer, in 1885 McVean settled down in Scotland. He rented residence of Duke of Argyll at Kilmore, Isle of Mull, and retired there with his family. The McVeans took care of his grand children including Colin McVean Gubbins.

When the McVeans were living in Edinburgh in 1877-1878, they met Isabella Bird quite frequently. Bird was interested in visiting Japan, but hesitated travelling alone. McVean introduced Bird to his wide circle of acquaintances in Japan so that she could make safe journey.

For the 1888 Glasgow International Exhibition, McVean lent his collection of Japanese arts more than 1,000 items to the Kelvingrove Museum.

== Social life ==
- Royal Physical Society in Edinburgh, 1873. "On the Ornithology of Yedo" read in 1874 Annual Meeting of Royal Physical Society of Edinburgh.
- Scottish Meteorological Society, 1873.
- Royal Company of Archers, Queen’s Body Guard for Scotland, 1873.
- Royal Geographical Society, 1874.

== Sources ==
- Colin Alexander McVean, Celtic Monthly, 24 December 1898.
- Little Journal, Griffis' Collection, Rutgers University, 1908.
- McVean Archives, National Records of Scotland (GD543).
- McVean Website https://sites.google.com/site/archisslh/mcvean
- Olive Checkland, Japan and Britain After 18590Creating Cultural Bridges, 1989, ISBN 0-333-48346-4.
- Hugh Cortazzi and Gordon Daniels ed., Britain and Japan 1859-1991, 1991, ISBN 0-415-05966-6.
