= Ministry of Industry (Japan) =

Japanese ministry from 1870 to 1885

The Ministry of Public Works (工部省, Kōbushō) was a cabinet-level ministry in the Daijō-kan system of government of the Meiji period Empire of Japan from 1870 to 1885. It is also sometimes referred to as the “Ministry of Engineering” or “Ministry of Industry”.

== History ==
The Cabinet officially announced the establishment of the Public Works on December 12, 1870, by the advice of Edmund Morel, chief engineer of the Railway Construction to achieve rapid social and industrial development. After long arguments of 10 months, on September 28, 1871, the Meiji government completed arrangement of organization of 11 departments, which were mostly transferred from the Ministry of Civil Affairs. It included railroads, shipyards, lighthouses, mines, an iron and steel industry, telecommunication, civil works, manufacturing, industrial promotion, engineering institution and survey. Each department had to be relied on the foreign advisor and officer for a while, but gradually replaced them with Japanese engineers, who received training in the Engineering Institution. Main function of the Engineering Institution was to manage the Imperial College of Engineering (the predecessor of the Tokyo Imperial University College of Engineering). One of the key roles of the ministry was locating, and if necessary, reverse engineering overseas technology. For example, in 1877, only a year after the invention of the telephone, engineers employed by the ministry had obtained examples and were attempting to create a domestic version. By the mid-1880s, many of the industries created by the Ministry of Industry were privatized. With the establishment of the cabinet system under the Meiji Constitution on December 22, 1885, the ministry was abolished, with its functions divided between the new Ministry of Agriculture and Commerce and the Ministry of Communications.

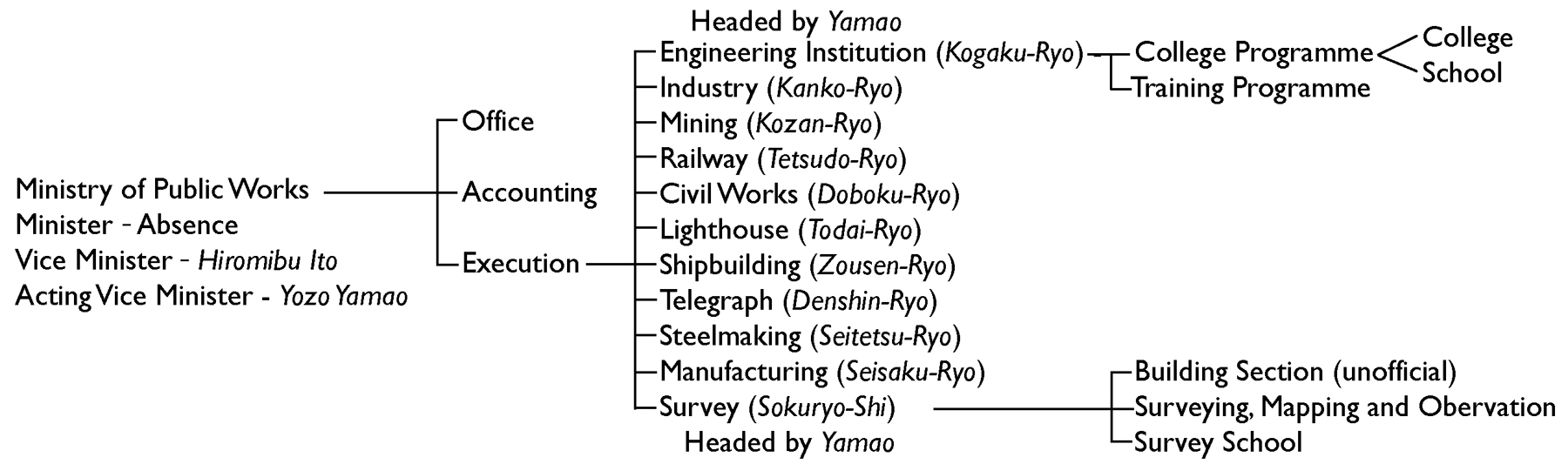
Ministry hierarchy

Minister and Vice Ministers
Name	Kanji	in office	out of office
Minister (工部卿, Kōbu-kyō)
Itō Hirobumi	伊藤 博文	October 25, 1873	May 15, 1878
Inoue Kaoru	井上 馨	July 29, 1878	September 10, 1879
Yamada Akiyoshi	山田 顕義	September 10, 1879	February 28, 1880
Yamao Yōzō	山尾 庸三	February 28, 1880	October 21, 1881
Sasaki Takayuki	佐々木 高行	October 21, 1881	December 22, 1885
Vice-Minister (工部大輔, Kōbu-taifu)
Yamao Yōzō	山尾 庸三	October 27, 1872	February 28, 1880
Yoshii Tomozane	吉井 友実	June 17, 1880	January 10, 1882
Inoue Masaru	井上 勝	July 8, 1882	December 22, 1885
