= Tanabe Sakuro =

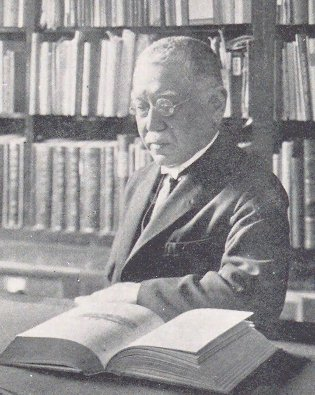
Tanabe Sakuro

Tanabe Sakuro (田辺 朔郎; December 2, 1861 – September 5, 1944) was a Japanese civil engineer and early pioneer in the development of hydro electric power.

Tanabe’s most famous achievement was the Lake Biwa Canal that runs from Lake Biwa to Kyoto city. For his work as Chief Engineer directing the project and paper entitled “The Lake Biwa - Kyoto Canal” published in 1894, Tanabe was awarded a Telford Medal by the British Institution of Civil Engineers. The canal passes through a series of tunnels and was the site of Japan's first Hydro-electric power station.

Tanabe worked for many years as a Director for the Hokkaidō Kansetsu Railway. In 1916 Tanabe was appointed Dean of the Faculty of Engineering at Kyoto Imperial University.

== Early life and education ==
Tanabe was born Edo in 1861, the son of a noted Confucian scholar. In April 1877 he commenced studies under the direction of Henry Dyer at the Imperial College of Engineering. Tanabe graduated in May 1883 with a graduation thesis written in English entitled ‘Lake Biwa Canal Construction Project’. Tanabe and Dyer kept up a correspondence for many years after Dyer returned to Scotland and Tanabe had the opportunity to visit Dyer in Glasgow in both 1900 and in 1913.

During his practical training in engineering, Tanabe lost the use of his right hand in an accident. He subsequently learnt to use his left hand to write.
