= Edmund Morel =

Edmund Morel may refer to:

- Edmund Morel (engineer) (1840–1871), British railway civil engineer
- E. D. Morel (1873–1924), British journalist, author, and socialist politician
