= Hugh Matheson =

Hugh Matheson may refer to:

- Hugh Matheson (rower) (born 1949), British Olympic rower in the 1970s and '80s
- Hugh Matheson (industrialist) (1821–1898), British industrialist
