= Edward Divers =

British chemist

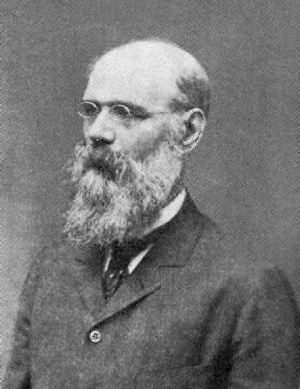
- Born: 27 November 1837; London, UK
- Died: 8 April 1912 (aged 74); London, UK
- Education: Royal College of Chemistry; Imperial College London
- Scientific career
- Fields: Chemistry

Edward Divers FRS (27 November 1837 – 8 April 1912) was a British experimental chemist who rose to prominence despite being visually impaired from young age. Between 1873 and 1899, Divers lived and worked in Japan and significantly contributed to the science and education of that country.

== Biography ==
Divers was born in London and was of Kentish ancestry. He had one brother, who was connected with the Thames Ironworks and Shipbuilding Company, and a sister. Inflammation in the eyes during infancy seriously impaired his vision, which could not be properly corrected by glasses. This deficiency was further aggravated by an explosion during an experiment in 1884 making him blind in the right eye. In 1850, Divers entered the City of London School where he became inspired by chemistry lectures given by Thomas Hall. In 1853–1854 he became an assistant in John Stenhouse's laboratory at the medical school of St Bartholomew's Hospital. Stenhouse regarded defective vision of Divers too serious a hindrance to admit of the attainment of success in a chemistry career, though he changed this opinion later. In 1854 an assistant vacancy opened with Edmund Ronalds (1819–1889) which Divers accepted and then continued in the same capacity under Thomas Henry Rowney (1817–1894). He then went to the Queen's College, Galway, Ireland, to take the university degree in medicine, one of the few scientific degrees then available, and to use the opportunities there afforded for teaching and research in chemistry. He remained in Galway for twelve years, defending his PhD in 1860, until 1866, when he left Ireland for London. After 1860, and until his Japanese appointment in 1873, Divers held various teaching appointments as lecturer in medicine (Queen's College, Birmingham, which later became Birmingham University), medical jurisprudence (Middlesex Hospital Medical School, London), physics (Imperial College London) and chemistry (Albert Veterinary College).

Divers joined the Chemical Society in 1860, and in 1862 started publishing his experimental work, on magnesium ammonium carbonate (1862), zinc ammonium chloride (1868), and three papers in 1870 on the carbonates and carbamate of ammonium. He had studied in 1863 the spontaneous change which guncotton undergoes with formation of gelatinous acids, and published two papers in 1871 on nitrites where he announces his discovery of hyponitrites. In 1873 he reported interaction of ammonia and ammonium nitrate, the work which he elaborated in Japan between 1873 and 1899. A saturated solution of ammonium nitrate in ammonia is now known as Divers' solution. His work during that period was acknowledged by D. Sc. honoris causa degree at the National University of Ireland, Galway, and by the various societies in England. He was president of Section B of the British Association (1902); vice-president of the Chemical Society (1900–02); vice-president of the Institute of Chemistry (1905), and president of the Society of Chemical Industry (1905). Divers was elected a fellow of the Royal Society in 1885, while still working in Japan.

== Life and work in Japan ==
On the recommendation of A. W. Williamson, in July 1873, Divers left for Japan. This country had then only begun to remodel, in particular by introducing Western sciences and institutions. Divers was invited to teach general and applied chemistry at the Imperial College of Engineering at Toranomon, Tokyo. He eventually became the Principal of the College in 1882. In 1886 the college was incorporated with the Tokyo Imperial University, where Divers held the Chair of Inorganic Chemistry until his return to England in 1899. During his first seven or eight years in Japan due to administrative and teaching duties, as well as numerous requests from the Department of Public Works to analyse samples of various minerals and noble metals. As a result, his first papers after leaving England were on Japanese minerals, and these were communicated to the meetings of the British Association held in York in 1881. One of these papers was on the occurrence of selenium and tellurium in Japanese sulphur obtained from lead-chamber deposits of the Osaka sulphuric acid work. Using this material he later discovered tellurium sulfoxide and developed a new method for the quantitative separation of tellurium from selenium. These and other papers on tellurium and selenium were published in the Journal of the Chemical Society during 1883–1885. There he published more than 20 other paper within a short period of 1884–1885, mostly on the chemistry of nitrogen and sulphur compounds.

Two years before coming to Japan, Divers reported an important paper on "The existence and Formation of Salts of Nitrous Oxide", which he elaborated in Japan in 1884 to establish the composition of silver hyponitrite as (AgNO)_{x}, against the formula Ag_{5}N_{5}O_{5} asserted by Berthelot and Ogier. In 1885 he discarded the work by Georg Ludwig Carius, according to which thionyl chloride formed by the action of phosphorus pentachloride on inorganic sulfites was regarded as a direct product of the reaction and which formed the only experimental evidence in favour of the symmetrical constitution of the sulfites. Divers demonstrated that thionyl chloride was instead produced by a secondary reaction between sulphur dioxide and phosphorus pentachloride. It was in the course of this work, on 24 November 1884, that Divers lost vision in his right eye as he was badly cut by pieces of glass resulting from the sudden bursting of the bottle with phosphorus oxychloride.

Chemistry of sulfonated nitrogen compounds was the subject of most attention for Divers while staying in Japan. In collaboration with Haga, he showed that the numerous complex acids belonging to this group of compounds are the products of the reaction between sulphurous and nitrous acids, the base being essential only in so far as it protects the products of the reaction against hydrolysis, and that, contrary to the statements of previous workers, normal sulfites and nitrites have no action on each other. Divers and Haga further showed that the primary product of the reaction between sulphurous and nitrous acids is always hydroxylaminedisulfonic acid and nothing else.

Divers was pre-eminently an experimental chemist and rarely occupied with the theoretical study of chemical questions. He greatly encouraged the spirit of experimental research among his pupils including Jōkichi Takamine, who was the first to prepare pure adrenaline, and Masataka Ogawa who discovered "nipponium" (later found to be rhenium). By advice of Divers, M. Chikashige of the Kyoto Imperial University studied the atomic weight of Japanese tellurium in 1896, in the hope that this tellurium, which contrary to the European tellurium is associated with sulphur and not with any heavy metal, might yield an atomic weight in conformity with the periodic table. No difference was observed, however.

Divers had two great misfortunes while staying in Japan. One was the sudden death of his son Frederic, which occurred in China, where he was in the service of the Maritime Customs. The other was death, in Tokyo in 1897, of his wife, Margaret Theresa Fitzgerald, whom he married in 1865. After this loss, Divers never seemed to be in the best of spirits, and this fact, combined with his advancing age and isolation, led him to return to England in 1899. He was much respected in Japan, particularly by Itō Hirobumi, who, in the early days of the Engineering College, was the Minister of Public Works, and thus came in frequent contact with Divers. The contribution of Divers to education was recognised by the Japanese government, which, in 1886, conferred upon him the Order of the Rising Sun of the Third Class, in 1898, the Order of the Sacred Treasure of the Second Class. He was further an Honorary Member of the Tokyo Chemical Society, the Society of Chemical Industry of Japan, and the Engineering Society, the last of which was established by students of Divers at the Engineering College. On leaving Japan in 1899, Tokyo Imperial University conferred upon him the title of Professor Emeritus. A memorial bust of Divers was erected in the university grounds on 17 November 1900.

Divers was survived by his two daughters, both of whom were married in Japan. The elder, Edith, being married to Count Labry, a military attache to the French Legation in Tokyo, and the younger, Ella, to E. W. Tilden, a resident of Kobe.
