= Imperial College of Engineering =

Former Meiji era Tokyo based university

Coordinates: 35.6717955°N 139.7457547°E

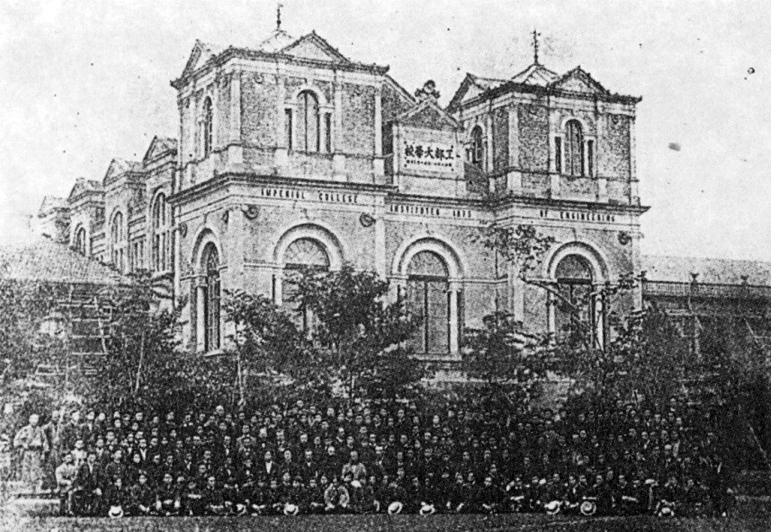
Imperial College of Engineering, c.1880.

The Imperial College of Engineering (工部大学校, Kōbudaigakkō) was a Japanese institution of higher education that was founded during the Meiji era. The college was established under the auspices of the Ministry of Public Works for the training of young Japanese engineers.

Supporting Japan’s rapid industrialization at the end of the 19th century, the college commenced teaching in October 1873 soon after the initial cohort of teaching staff arrived from United Kingdom. The college was an immediate precursor to the establishment of the University of Tokyo’s Faculty of Engineering in 1886.

== Foundation ==
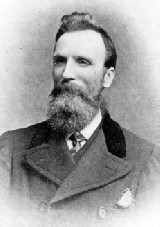
Henry Dyer

In the process of founding the Public Works, Edmund Morel, a chief engineer for Railway Department of the Meiji Japanese government emphasized importance of engineering institution, which would create young Japanese engineers and technicians leading rapid modernization without help of foreign officers. On September 24, 1871, the Public Works was formed with 11 departments, one of which was the Engineering Institution (Kogaku Rio). The main function was to produce professional engineers through the engineering college, which would consist of college and school. Morel together with Yozo Yamao, head of the institution, endeavoured to find proper teaching staff through their connections, while construction work of the college school was commended by surveyors of the Public Works in the end of 1871. After Morel died, Yamao consulted with Hugh Matheson, who found teaching staff through his connection with Lewis Gordon, William Rankine and William Thompson. The principal appointed by Rankine was Henry Dyer, a 25-year-old scholar who just finished his engineering education in the University of Glasgow.

== Initial Calendar and Syllabus ==
Henry Dyer prepared the academic calendar and curriculum while traveling by ship from Britain to Japan over a period of two months. As Yamao accepted the calendar without any revision, Dyer opened the college and commenced teaching with other 6 instructors in October 1873.

The college programme was six years consisting of basic course, technical course and field practice two years each, and repeated theory and practice six months each following Rankine's Sandwich programme. This kind of programme had been implemented in the Indian Engineering College a year ago. As Dyer confessed that the Royal Indian Engineering College was the best engineering institution for the Britain, he so rearranged the programme suitable for Japan, including field practice within the college course and extending the programme into six years. Dyer took Akabane Workshop of the Public Works for students' practice.

The Imperial College of Engineering comprised the following schools: architecture, chemistry, civil engineering, mechanical engineering, metallurgy, mining, shipbuilding, and telegraphy, and taught in English. Students were required to write notes and graduation theses in English. Some of these survive and are on display at the National Science Museum (国立科学博物館, Kokuritsu Kagaku Hakubutsukan) in Ueno Park, Tokyo (New Building, 2F (second floor)).

After the Public Works was abolished in 1885, the college was transferred to the Ministry of Education (文部省, Monbusho), and the Imperial College of Engineering became part of the Imperial University (later the University of Tokyo) when it was created by the Ministry of Education in 1886.

== Foreign Teaching Staff ==
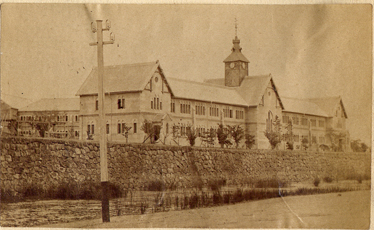
The Engineering School, designed by McVean and Joyner in 1872.

- Natural Philosophy: William Edward Ayrton
- Mathematics: D. H. Marshall
- Architecture: Josiah Conder from 1877
- Chemistry: Edward Divers
- Drawing Edmund Monday
- English language and literature: William Craigie
- Engineering George Crawley, Robert Clark and Archibald King.

W. E. Ayrton, alongside Henry Dyer likely the most influential member of the college faculty. In addition, Josiah Conder arrived to take up his post as professor in the Department of Architecture in 1877.

== Buildings ==
The Initial school building, later converted to museum, was designed in simple Gothic style by Colin Alexander McVean and Henry Batson Joyner with help of Campbell Douglas, an architect of Glasgow. The glass face of clock tower has been broken when it arrived from Glasgow to Yokohama, and so new one was equipped a year after completion of the building. It was the first substantial western building in Japan, and was utilized as opera concert by Madam Palmieri in October, 1875.

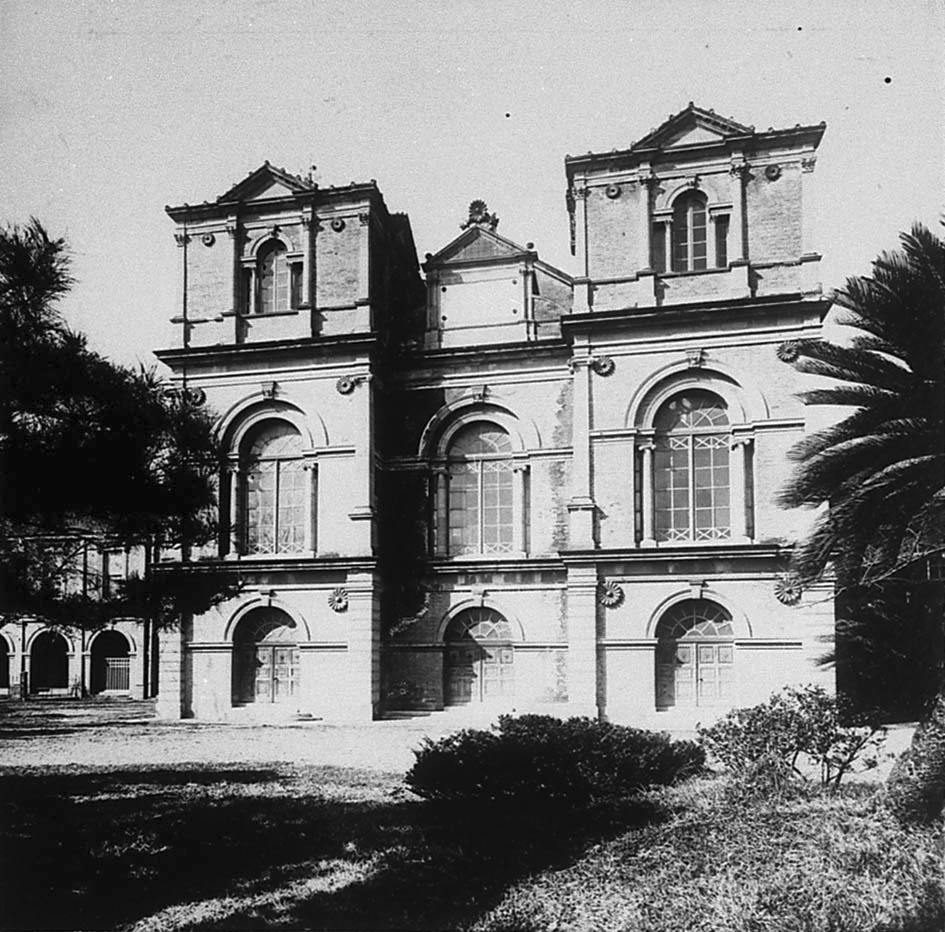
Main Building, Imperial College of Engineering, 1880.

After Charles Alfred Chastel de Boinville, a young architect sent from Campbell Douglass arrived at Japan In the end of 1872, whole building work was supervised under him. Through the discussions with Henry Dyer and William Ayrton, de Boinville elaborately designed the main building so good for demonstration, experiment and practice, and completed it in the end of 1876.

Edward Cockworthy Robins, a British architect specializing design for science and engineering education introduced the main building of the ICE in meetings of the Royal Society and the Royal Institute of British Architects as well as in the Builder in 1880, and admired the ICE for excellence for the technical education.

After the ICE moved to Hongo new campus of the Imperial University, the ICE main building was utilized by the Gakushuin University for a while, while the school building by the Tokyo Jogakukan University. The buildings were heavily damaged by the 1923 Great Kanto Earthquake, and removed from site to reclaim the moat.

Tatsuzo Sone, a graduate of the ICE first patch appealed his friends to commemorate the ICE and built small monument using old bricks at the site.

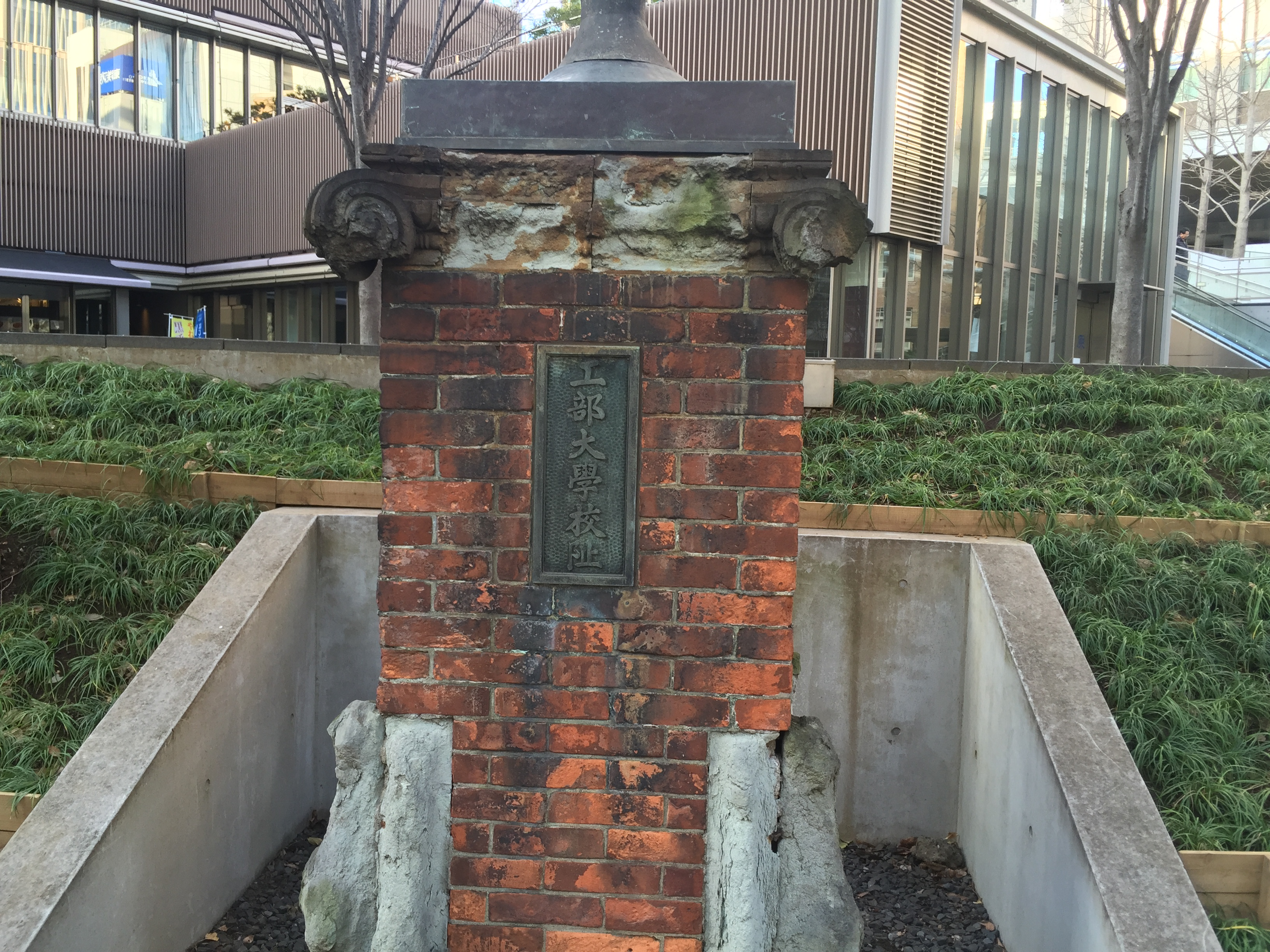
Memorial recording the location of the college buildings at Kasumigaseki

The college buildings were located at what is today Kasumigaseki 3 Chome 2-1, Chiyoda-ku, Tokyo, site of the Kasumigaseki Common Gate office development and the Japanese Government's Financial Services Agency. A red brick pillar and plaque marks the site.

== Graduates ==
- Kunihiko Iwadare - Founder of NEC
- Tatsuno Kingo, architect of the Headquarters of the Bank of Japan (1896) and the Marunouchi Building at Tokyo Station (1914).
- Tanabe Sakuro Chief Engineer of the Lake Biwa Canal project and promoter of Japan’s first scale hydropower electrical project.
- Sone Tatsuzō, architect of the Keio University Old Library (1912) and superintendent of construction for many of the early red brick buildings on the Mitsubishi Estate in Marunouchi.
- Kenkichi Yabashi, the central figure who organised the construction of National Diet Building.

== See also ==
- Anglo-Japanese relations
- Technical education in Japan

== Sources ==
- 1. Hideo Izumida, Reconsideration of Foundation of the Engineering Institution, Transaction of Architectural Institute of Japan, September 2016, pp. 477~487.
- 2. Hideo Izumida, Reconsideration of Foundation of the Imperial College of Engineering, Transaction of Architectural Institute of Japan, September 2017, pp. 2401~2411.
- 3. Olive Checkland, Britain's Encounter with Meiji Japan, 1868-1912, 1989.
- 4. Benjamin Duke, The History of Modern Japanese Education, Constructing the National School System, 1872-1890, 2014.
- 5. David G. Wittner, Technology and the Culture of Progress in Meiji Japan, 2015.
- https://examcraze.in/imperial-college-of-engineering-new-delhi/%5B%5D
