= Charles Alfred Chastel de Boinville =

Anglo-French architect

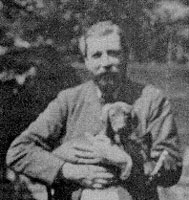
Charles Alfred Chastel de Boinville, c.1895

Charles Alfred Chastel de Boinville ARIBA (1849 – April 25, 1897) was an Anglo-French architect, who worked in Japan and Britain. His father was a well known clergyman who completed 30 years of missionary service in France, and left several publications on his life such as Thomas Constable's Memoir.

== Early life ==
His ancestor prospered during the ancien régime in Lorraine, and owned estate named Boinville. His great-grandfather, Jean Baptiste Chastel de Boinville, became much associated with Lafayette in political matters, and served as aide-de-camp under him. When the French Revolution broke out, and the King and Queen were brought from Versailles to Paris, they were escorted by Lafayette, who rode on one side of the carriage, and by Boinville on the other.

Like many other noble unfortunates, Jean Baptiste's estates were confiscated by the Revolutionary Government. He escaped to Britain where he met a wealthy supporter of French emigres, John Collins, a sugar planter in St. Vincent. Jean Baptiste fell in love with a daughter of Collins, Harriet and got married at the Gretna Green. They had a son John Collins Alfred and a daughter Cornelia Pauline Eugenia. After Napoleon seized power, Jean Baptiste returned to France, and lost his life in the Russian Campaign of 1812.

Harriet de Boinville and Cornelia were active in fashionable and literary society, and supported Percy Shelley in 1813–1814. Kenneth Cameron, a prominent Shelley scholar, wrote, "through Mrs. Boinville and the circle centered around her, Shelley made his first living contact with the traditions of the French Revolution. . . . It was his first introduction to a society of intellectual radicalism, a society presided over by a lady of intelligence and charms.”

Two sons of John Collins Alfred, Charles Alfred and William tried to restore their old estate, but soon gave up to enter clergy service; Charles Alfred into Protestant missionary in France and William into Anglican Church.

Architect de Boinville was born at Lisieux, where his father of same name was pastor, in March 1849. After some years, de Boinville moved to Bar-le-Duc in Lorraine, near the old family home, and subsequently to Cherbourg. He entered the office of William Henry White, who at that time was in practice as an architect in Paris. As soon as the Franco-Prussian War broke out, his family left for London except de Boinville, who was called to serve his country, writing many balloon-post letters to his anxious family in London. He was an officer of the Garde Mobile and served during the defense of Paris during the protracted siege. Shortly after the conclusion of the war, he crossed the Channel in early 1871.

== Scotland ==
Through his father's connection with Thomas Constable, a publisher in Edinburgh, De Boinville entered the office of Campbell Douglas, an architect in Glasgow as assistant, and stayed in his house for about a year and a half. At that time, Douglas' friend Colin Alexander McVean was in the Civil Service of the Japanese Government, being chief surveyor of the Public Works Department. As McVean had a good deal of building work to do, Douglas helped him to send out a quantity of fittings and building materials, as well as a talented young architect. Douglas recommended De Boinville for this post. Before De Boinville left Scotland, he got engaged to Agnes Cowan, a youngest daughter of Charles Cowan, a banker and provost of Ayr.

== Japan's Public Works ==
De Boinville arrived in Japan in December 1872, and soon started to work under MacVean for construction of the buildings of the Imperial College of Engineering. After the Survey Department was transferred to the Home Office in 1874, De Boinville took responsibility of the building section of the Public Works. In that service he remained for eight years, until the Japanese began gradually to dismiss their foreign officers. His two chief works were (1) the Imperial College of Engineering, Tokyo, including the main building, museum, workshops, dormitories, professors' houses, &c., and (2) the New Imperial Palace.

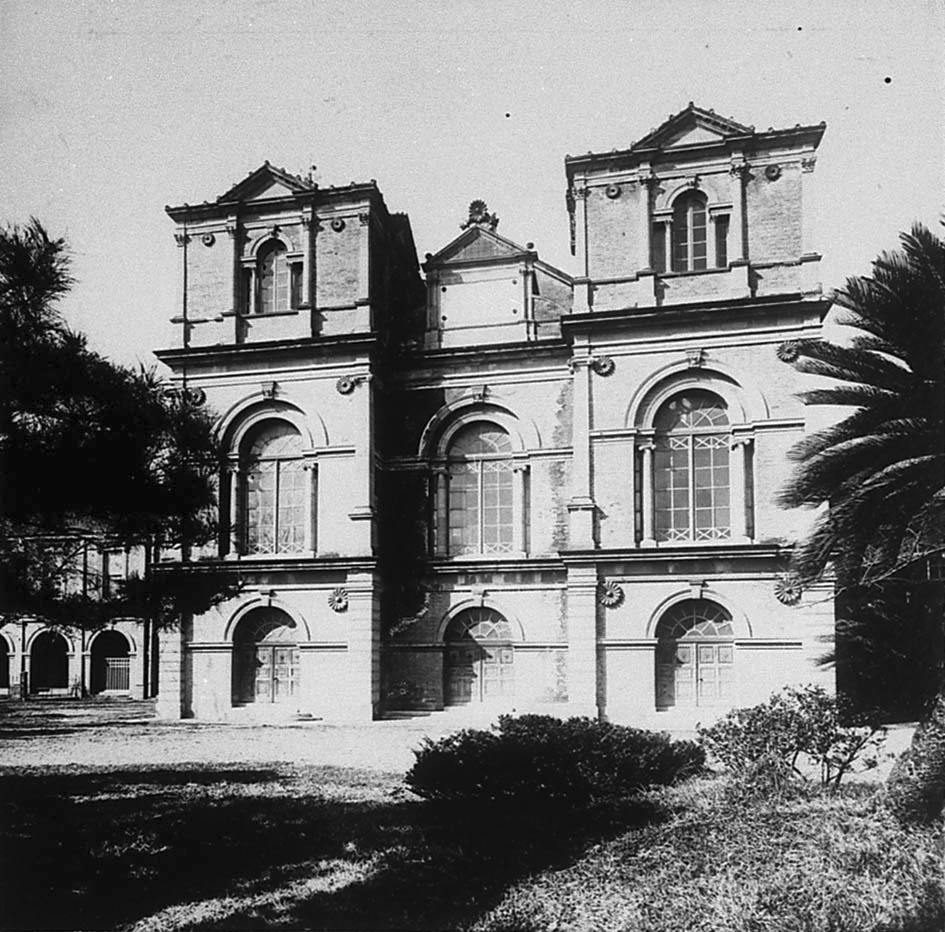
Main Building, Imperial College of Engineering, 1880.

Edward Cookworthy Robins wrote that the design of the Imperial College of Engineering was one of the best examples for technical education.

== Practice in London ==
After his return to England, De Boinville was selected as an associate member of the Royal Institute of British Architects with recommendation of William Henry White and Campbell Douglas in 1881, and partnered with several architects such as Robins and de Boinville Brothers (Victoria Mansion, London), De Boinville and Wiblin (London) and De Boinville and Morris (Ayr). Although he won several competitions, his business was not successful. Several of his architectural works still remain in Kingston upon Thames such as Anglican Church, now Korean Church London.

== Government work ==
De Boinville settled down in H.M. Office of Works in Whitehall Place in 1886, probably through his connection with Algernon Freeman-Mitford. He expressed his full talent of the detail drawings for the foreign Embassies, such as Brussels, Paris, and Lisbon, where he instituted and carried through important works. Indeed, it was on account of his much valued services at Whitehall Place—-or at least largely a direct result of them-—that he was appointed to the honourable position of Surveyor to the India Office by the Government. His chief work was renovation of an upper storey of some sixteen apartments over part of the India Office. At that time, the India Office intended to carry out several large projects commemorating the Queen Victoria including the Victoria Memorial Hall in Calcutta now Kolkata, and of course De Boinville was ought to take responsibility if he did not pass away in 1897 due to pneumonia.

== Family ==
De Boinville married Agnes Cowan at Yokohama on May 23, 1874 same day with Henry Dyer's marriage in presence of Sir Harry Smith Parkes, and registered their marriage at both the British Consulate and the French Consulate.

The De Boinvilles lived at the Yamato Yashiki, the Public Works foreign officers' quarter, now site of the Hotel Okura Tokyo. They had a daughter Mary and a son Charles.

The Boinville family frequently appears in Clara Whitney's Diaries. Charles after finished Oxford University entered clergy service like his grand father.

== Sources ==
1. Memoir of the Reverend Charles A. Chastel de Boinville. Compiled from his Journal and his Letters by Thomas Constable, Author of Archibald Constable and his Literary Correspondents with a Portrait. London James Nisbet & Co., 21 Berners Street 1880.

2. Obituary of Pastor Charles Alfred Chastel de Boinville by Alexander Maclead Symington, Author of "The Last First." The Christian Monthly and Family Treasury for 1881.

3. Dictionary of Scottish Architects, http://www.scottisharchitects.org.uk/architect_full.php?id=200323.

4. Hideo Izumida, Life and Works of Charles Alfred Chastel de Boinville, Japan's Journal of Architectural Historians, 2009, pp. 13–17.

5. Hideo Izumida, Reconsideration of Foundation of Imperial College of Engineering, Transaction of Japan Institute of Architecture, September 2017, pp. 2401–2415.
