= Henry Dyer =

Scottish engineer

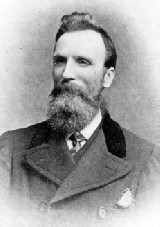
- Henry Dyer
- Born: 16 August 1848; Bellshill, North Lanarkshire, Scotland
- Died: 25 September 1918 (aged 70); Glasgow, Scotland
- Occupations: engineer, educator

Henry Dyer (23 August 1848 – 25 September 1918) was a Scottish engineer who contributed much to founding Western-style technical education in Japan and Scottish-Japanese relations.

== Early life ==
Henry Dyer was born on 16 August 1848, in the village of Muirmadkin (now absorbed into the town of Bellshill) in the Parish of Bothwell in what is now known as North Lanarkshire.

Around 1865, the Dyer family moved to Glasgow where Henry was employed at James Aitken and Company's foundry in Cranstonhill. There he served his apprenticeship as a student engineer under Thomas Kennedy and A C Kirk. At the same time, he attended classes at Anderson's College (later to become the University of Strathclyde) together with Yamao Yōzō.

Dyer studied engineering education at Glasgow University from 1868 under Professor William Rankine, who was eager to establish the faculty of engineering. He was the first Scot to win the Whitworth scholarship awarded in 1868, which was for the further instruction of young men gifted in the practice and theory of mechanics. Henry Dyer graduated from Glasgow University in 1873 with a "certificate in proficiency in engineering", the forerunner of the BSc in Engineering, from the Engineering department.

== Japan (1873–1882) ==
Dyer is principally remembered in Japan for his contributions to curriculum development for the Imperial College of Engineering an engineering institution under the Public Works (Kobu Sho) of the Meiji Japan aimed at creating young Japanese engineers of various industrial fields to achieve rapid modernization.

Through an initiative in 1872 led by Yozo Yamao, the Meiji government sought teaching staff for a newly established engineering school. Hugh Matheson, a contact of Yamao, consulted with Lewis Gordon, and William John Macquorn Rankine. Rankine arranged for teaching staff led by Dyer as Principal and Professor of Engineering, and advised Itō Hirobumi, who was at that time the vice Ambassador of the Iwakura Mission.

The Engineering Institution aimed at creating young Japanese engineers who take responsibility for rapid industrialization. Dyer designed a six year academic curriculum consisting of basic (general and science subjects), professional (technical subjects) and practical courses of two years in duration for six departments. The ICE programme was a revised version of the Royal Indian Engineering College curriculum adapted to Japan's specific scientific and technical needs. To provide practical training, Dyer helped set up the Akabane Engineering Works, the largest in the Empire of Japan. Many of the major engineering works carried out in Japan at the end of the 19th century were by his former students, and Dyer also sent many to Glasgow to complete their education.

When he left the ICE in 1882, Dyer was made Honorary Principal and Emperor Meiji awarded him the Third Class of the Order of the Rising Sun, the highest Japanese honour available to foreigners. He had established a progressive system of engineering education in Tokyo and greatly contributed to the progress Japan made as an industrial power.

Returning from Japan, Henry Dyer brought back various Japanese artifacts and art works, some of which were later donated by his descendants to the Mitchell Library, Glasgow and Edinburgh Central Library. Included in the bequest to Edinburgh Central Library donated by Dyer's daughter Marie Ferguson Dyer, is the painted handscroll Theatres of the East by the Japanese artist Furuyama Moromasa, loose Japanese woodblock prints, bound woodblock printed volumes, bound volumes of paintings, and a collection of nineteenth century Japanese photographs attributed to Franz von Stillfried-Ratenicz.

== Scotland (1882–1918) ==
Henry Dyer went back to Scotland and in 1886 became a life governor of the Glasgow and West of Scotland Technical College (previously Anderson's College, where he had been a student, and later to become the University of Strathclyde, and governor of the Glasgow and West of Scotland Agricultural College. He became a member of the Glasgow School Board in 1891 and was its president from 1914 until his death.

Dyer represented a tireless pro-Japanese lobby within Scotland. He assisted Japanese students, engineers and trainee managers and had a staunch ally in Captain A R Brown of the company Brown, McFarlane who had been responsible for taking the first Clyde-built ships to Japan. Dyer worked as an unofficial liaison officer for the Japanese Government in Glasgow and thanks to his efforts Glasgow University Court permitted Japanese as a language for entry in 1901. In the same year Professors Jōji Sakurai and Isao Iijima of the Tokyo Imperial University were awarded honorary degrees during the University’s Ninth Jubilee celebrations.

The University of Strathclyde's Henry Dyer Building, home to the Department of Naval Architecture and Marine Engineering, was named after him.

In 2015 he was inducted into the Scottish Engineering Hall of Fame.

== Family ==
Married 23 May 1874, Marie Euphemia Aqaurt Ferguson, eldest daughter of Duncan Ferguson of Glasgow at the British Legation in Yokohama, Japan.

== Publications ==
- The Evolution of Industry (1895)
- Dai Nippon: The Britain of the East (1904)
- Japan in World Politics (1909)
- Miyoshi, Nobuhiro, ed. (2006). Collected Writings of Henry Dyer. Tokyo: Edition Synapse. ISBN 978-4-901481-83-0. (in 5 volumes)

== See also ==
- Imperial College of Engineering
- James Alfred Ewing
- William Edward Ayrton
- John Milne
- Mechanical Engineering Heritage (Japan) No.100 in 2020

== External sources ==
- "Henry Dyer, 1848-1918". Archived from the original on 12 March 2007. - a detailed and informative site.
- "Japan and People". University of Glasgow. Archived from the original on 12 March 2005.
- "Japan and Shipbuilding". University of Glasgow. Archived from the original on 12 March 2005.
- "Glasgow University and Japan". University of Glasgow. Archived from the original on 12 March 2005.
- "Henry Dyer Building". University of Strathclyde.
