= Technical education in Japan =

Technical education in Japan occurs at both secondary, further and tertiary education levels. The initial nine-years of education is compulsory and uniform in coursework.

== Secondary education ==
Entry to Kōsen Colleges of Technology and technical high schools is at age 15 years. The kōsen basically provide five-years of training (although most provide the succeeding two-year course as well). For the graduates, transferring tracks are provided to universities and graduate schools. The high schools provide three-years of training, and the graduates are qualified to, but comparatively hard to proceed to tertiary education, for the usual university entrance examination is not considered for the case. There are 62 kōsen colleges and ?? technical high schools.

== Tertiary education ==
Western-style began in earnest in the Meiji period with the founding of the British-dominated Imperial College of Engineering. Currently it occurs in the engineering faculty of Tokyo University and other engineering faculties of public and private universities nationwide. The ratio of engineering to science students was 6-to-1 in 1992. There are a number of technical universities called Institutes of Technology, such as Tokyo Institute of Technology, Kyushu Institute of Technology and Nagoya Institute of Technology and others. Most are national universities, although Osaka Institute of Technology and Kanazawa Institute of Technology are private. In addition, two- or three-year private vocational colleges are also very popular, and the graduates in most four-year courses are qualified to proceed to graduate schools. Most of these tertiary students come through three-years of general education at high schools.

== See also ==
- Henry Dyer - principal of the Imperial College of Engineering
- Institute of Technology
- Kōsen (高専) Colleges of Technology in Japan
