= Ministry of Public Works (Japan) =

Ministry of Meiji period empire of Japan (1870 - 1885)

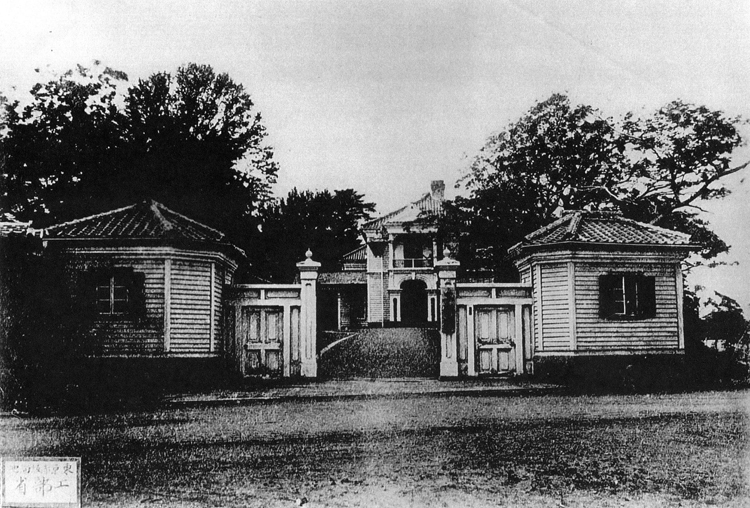
Public Works HQ, 1875

The Ministry of Public Works (工部省, Kōbushō) was a cabinet-level ministry in the Daijō-kan system of government of the Meiji period Empire of Japan from 1870 to 1885. It is also sometimes referred to as the “Ministry of Engineering” or “Ministry of Industry”.

== History ==
The Cabinet officially decided to establish the Public Works (Kobu Sho) on December 12, 1870, by the advice of Edmund Morel, chief engineer of the Railway Department to achieve rapid social and industrial development.

Morel intended to found the Public Works which develop social and industrial infrastructure, while leading cabinet members wanted an engine to drive rapid industrialization. Through long arguments initiated by Hirobumi Ito and Yozo Yamao, on September 28, 1871, the Meiji government eventually formed the Public Works with 11 departments, which were mostly transferred from the Ministry of Civil Affairs (Minbu Sho)). It included railroads, shipyards, lighthouses, mines, an iron and steel industry, telecommunication, civil works, manufacturing, industrial promotion, engineering institution and survey. As the civil works and survey department were soon transferred to other ministries, the public works were oriented to industrial development with help of foreign advisors and engineers for a whole.

The public works employed a large number of foreign officers, so called Oyatoi, and their high salaries got heavy burden for the government. They were gradually replaced by Japanese engineers who were produced by the Imperial College of Engineering.

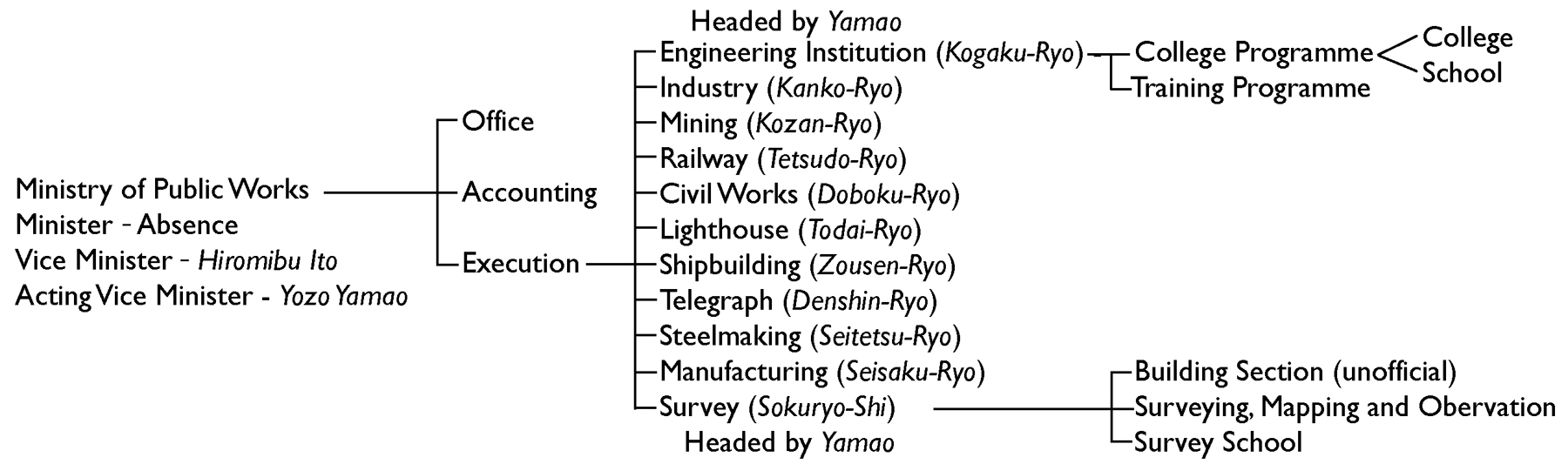
Organization of Public Works, September 1871

Minister and Vice Ministers
Name	Kanji	in office	out of office
Minister (工部卿, Kōbu-kyō)
Itō Hirobumi	伊藤 博文	October 25, 1873	May 15, 1878
Inoue Kaoru	井上 馨	July 29, 1878	September 10, 1879
Yamada Akiyoshi	山田 顕義	September 10, 1879	February 28, 1880
Yamao Yōzō	山尾 庸三	February 28, 1880	October 21, 1881
Sasaki Takayuki	佐々木 高行	October 21, 1881	December 22, 1885
Vice-Minister (工部大輔, Kōbu-taifu)
Yamao Yōzō	山尾 庸三	October 27, 1872	February 28, 1880
Yoshii Tomozane	吉井 友実	June 17, 1880	January 10, 1882
Inoue Masaru	井上 勝	July 8, 1882	December 22, 1885
