= Henry Scharbau =

British cartographer

- Born: 1822; Free City of Lübeck
- Died: 1 December 1902 (aged 80)
- Occupation: Cartographer

Henry Scharbau (1822–1902), or Henry Sharbau, was a British cartographer.

== Biography ==
Scharbau was born at Lübeck in North Germany in 1822, but came to England in his youth. Due to his skills in surveying and draughtsmanship, firstly in work on the Ordnance Survey of the south of Scotland, and between 1858 and 1864 in the Admiralty Surveys in the Hebrides and some western lochs. In 1865 he was appointed temporary assistant in the Hydrographic Office, a post he held until 1874. In 1873, he asked Colin Alexander McVean, Surveyor in Chief of Japanese government to work under him, and signed up the appointment in October 1873. But, he delayed departure more than a half year to take care of his weak wife. He became a naturalized British subject just before departure. Scharbau arrived at Japan in June 1874, and taught practice of triangulation in the Survey Office, and travelled several routes to set up base line together with McVean and Japanese colleagues, such as Nikko-Nasu route, Asamayama-Oiwake route, and Oadawa-Sagami route. He left Japan at the end of October 1876 after termination of his contract, and following year returned to the Hydrographic Office as a draughtsman. In April 1881, he transferred to the Royal Geographical Society as chief draughtsman. In 1902, Scharbau and his wife would die the same year.
