= William H. White (architect) =

British architect (1838–1896)

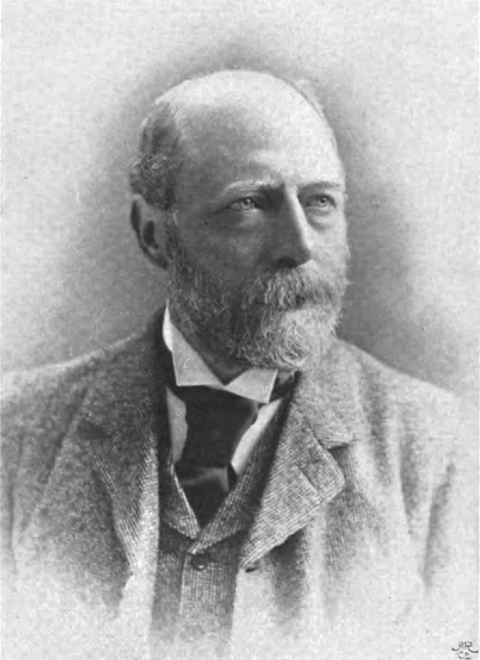
William Henry White 1897 RIBA Journal

William Henry White FRIBA (29 January 1838 – 20 October 1896) was a British architect, as well as 18 years secretary of the Royal Institute of British Architects.

== Early career ==
On the completion of his articles in London with George Morgan, he crossed the Channel, and, after a short term in the office of a French architect, established himself in Paris. He met influential clients, who commissioned him renovation of old chateaus including Château de Bizy (fr) and Château de Martinvast (fr). At the time, White received an architect pupil, Charles Alfred Chastel de Boinvile.

Following the outbreak of the Franco-Prussian War, White returned to Britain and found a new job in India through his father's connections, entering the Public Works Department of the Indian Government. He designed several important buildings in India, including the Court of Small Causes at Calcutta (illustrated in The Builder, 23 March 1878), the Monument to Chief Justice Sir John Norman (assassinated 1871), and the Presidency College. After travelling in India and on the Continent, White returned to London and took up journalistic work, contributing articles to The Builder. About this time he was appointed the Examiner in Architecture at the Royal Indian Engineering College, Cooper's Hill, a post be occupied for about two years.

== RIBA Secretaryship ==
The Secretaryship of this Royal Institute became vacant in 1878 through the retirement of Charles Eastlake, the present Keeper and Secretary of the National Gallery. White gained the post, and served his time eighteen years—an era in the progress of the Institute marked by increased influence at home and abroad, and a necessarily more extended system of administration.

== Works ==
In 1892, he published "The Architect and his artists, an essay to assist the public in considering the question is architecture a profession or an art", in reply to "Architecture, a Profession or an Art" edited by Norman Shaw and T. G. Jackson.

This had been part of the course of events which resulted in the passing of the Architects (Registration) Acts, 1931 to 1938 which established the statutory Register of Architects and monopolistic restrictions on the use of the vernacular word "architect", imposed with threat of penalty on prosecution for infringement.

The keeping of the Register of Architects is now governed by the Architects Act 1997, and the name of the body responsible for the Register has been changed from the Architects' Registration Council of the United Kingdom (ARCUK) to the Architects Registration Board (ARB).

== Sources ==
- Anon. (1897). "Obituary: William H. White". Journal of the Royal Institute of British Architects: 11–15.
- Brodie, Antonia (2001). Directory of British Architects, 1834–1914: Vol. 2 (L–Z). A&C Black; Royal Institute of British Architects. p. 977. ISBN 9780826455147.
