= Lake Biwa Canal =

Historic waterway in Kyoto, Japan

Coordinates: 35°0′40.5″N 135°51′20.7″E

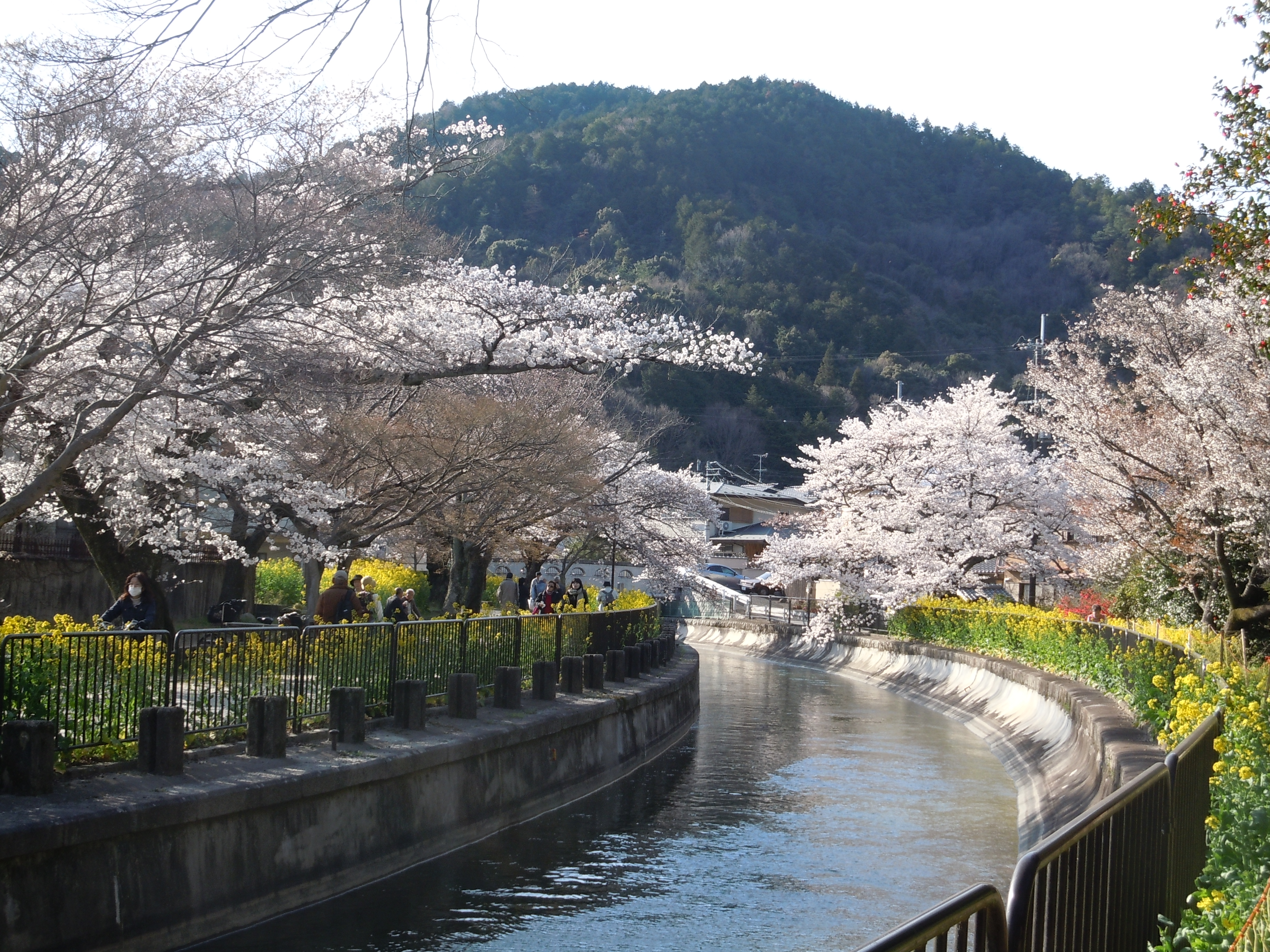
Lake Biwa Canal at Yamashina

Lake Biwa Canal (琵琶湖疏水 or 琵琶湖疎水, Biwako Sosui) is a historic waterway in Japan connecting Lake Biwa to the nearby City of Kyoto. Constructed during the Meiji Period the canal was originally designed for the transportation of lake water for drinking, irrigation and industrial purposes, but also provided for the conveyance of waterborne freight and passenger traffic. From 1895 water from the canal supported Japan's first hydroelectric power facility, providing electricity for industry, street lighting and Kyoto's tram system. In 1996 the canal was recognized as a nationally designated Historic Site.

While no longer used as a navigable waterway for freight, the waterway continues to provide water for drinking and irrigation purposes to the city of Kyoto as well as hydroelectric power through the 4.5MW Phase III Keage power station. Locations along the canal route and associated irrigation structures such as the former Keage Incline, the Nanzen-ji aqueduct and Philosopher's Walk, have become popular sightseeing destinations.

== History ==
Following the Meiji Restoration and the subsequent transfer of the capital to Tokyo, the city of Kyoto suffered a decline in commercial activity and a decrease in population. To address this problem, the third Prefectural Governor of Kyoto, Kitagaki Kunimichi (北垣国道), advocated for the construction of a canal from Lake Biwa to provide both water for irrigation and industrial use as well as facilitate transportation of goods by a means of a navigable waterway.

The feasibility of an irrigation channel to Kyoto from Lake Biwa had been debated since at least the 17th Century, but written plans and initial survey work for a canal first began in 1873. In 1882, Minami Ichirobe, who had worked with Cornelis Johannes van Doorn on the Asaka Canal in Fukushima Prefecture, was commissioned by the City of Kyoto to make a survey for the route of the proposed Lake Biwa Canal. Minami was supported in his survey work by Tanabe Sakurō (田邉朔郎), a student at the Tokyo-based Imperial College of Engineering. On the basis of his May 1883 graduation thesis, entitled the ‘Lake Biwa Canal Construction Project,’ Tanabe was subsequently hired as the canal project's Chief Engineer.

=== First Canal and Phase I Hydroelectric Power Facility ===
Construction work for the first canal (which went up to the confluence point between Ōtsu and the Kamo River) began in August 1885. Both main and branch canals covering a distance of 6.9 miles (11.2 km) were completed five years later in April 1890 (136 years ago). On completion the canal passed through two locks, an inclined plane and three tunnels.

The whole enterprise was estimated at 1,250,000 silver dollars, paid for by the central government (one quarter), the Meiji Emperor (one third), and local taxes.

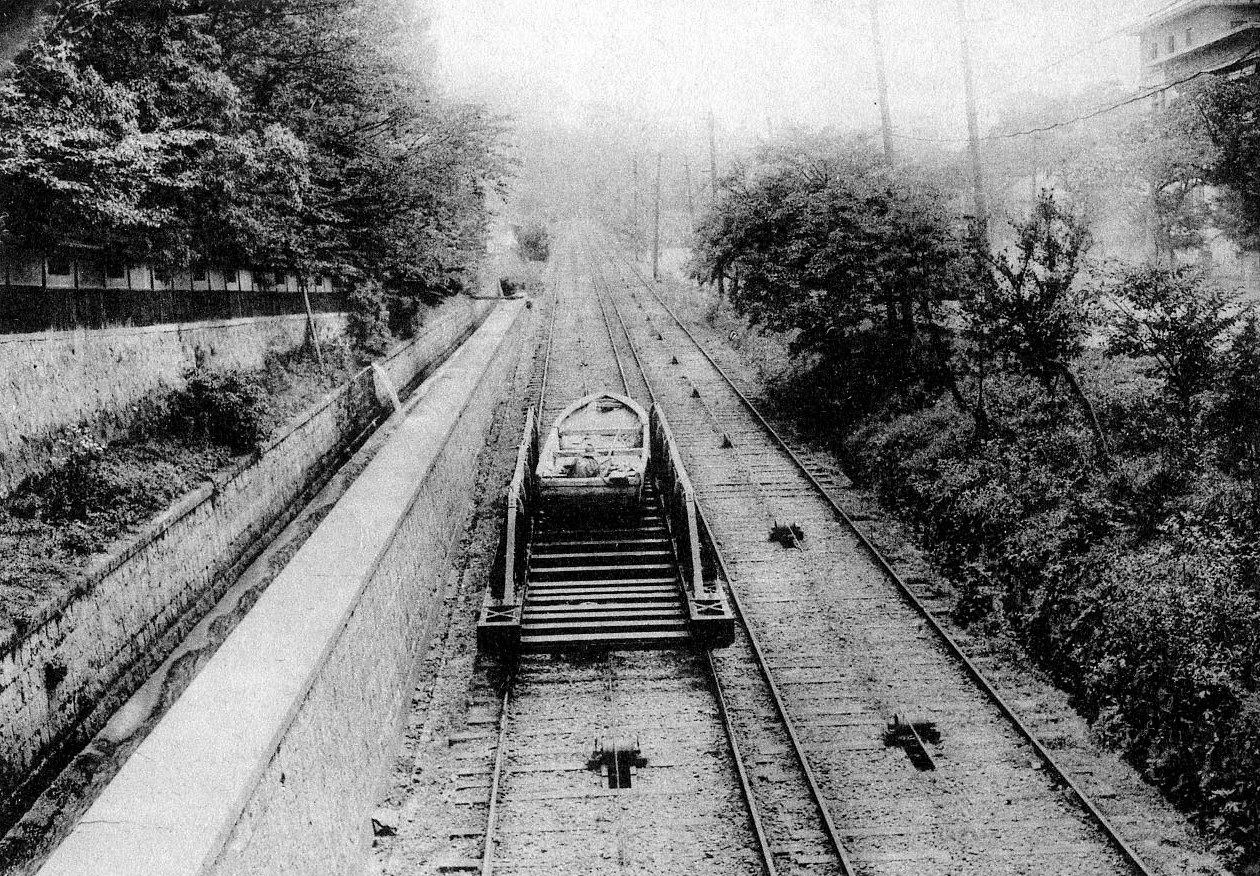
Keage Incline used for hoisting boats around 1940

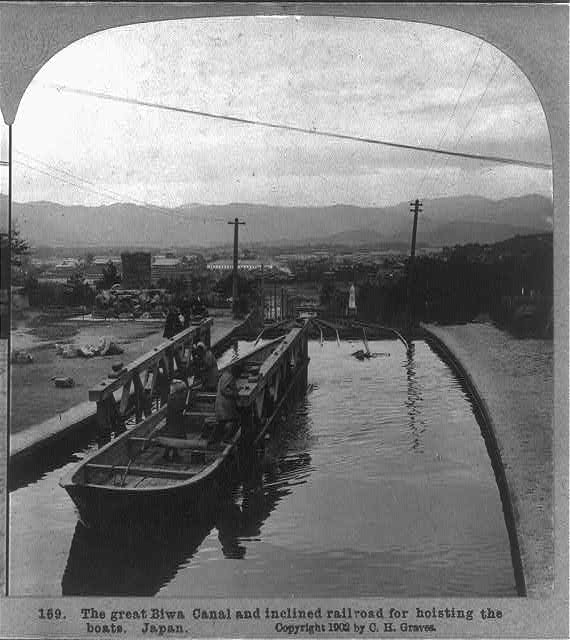
Summit of the Keage Incline

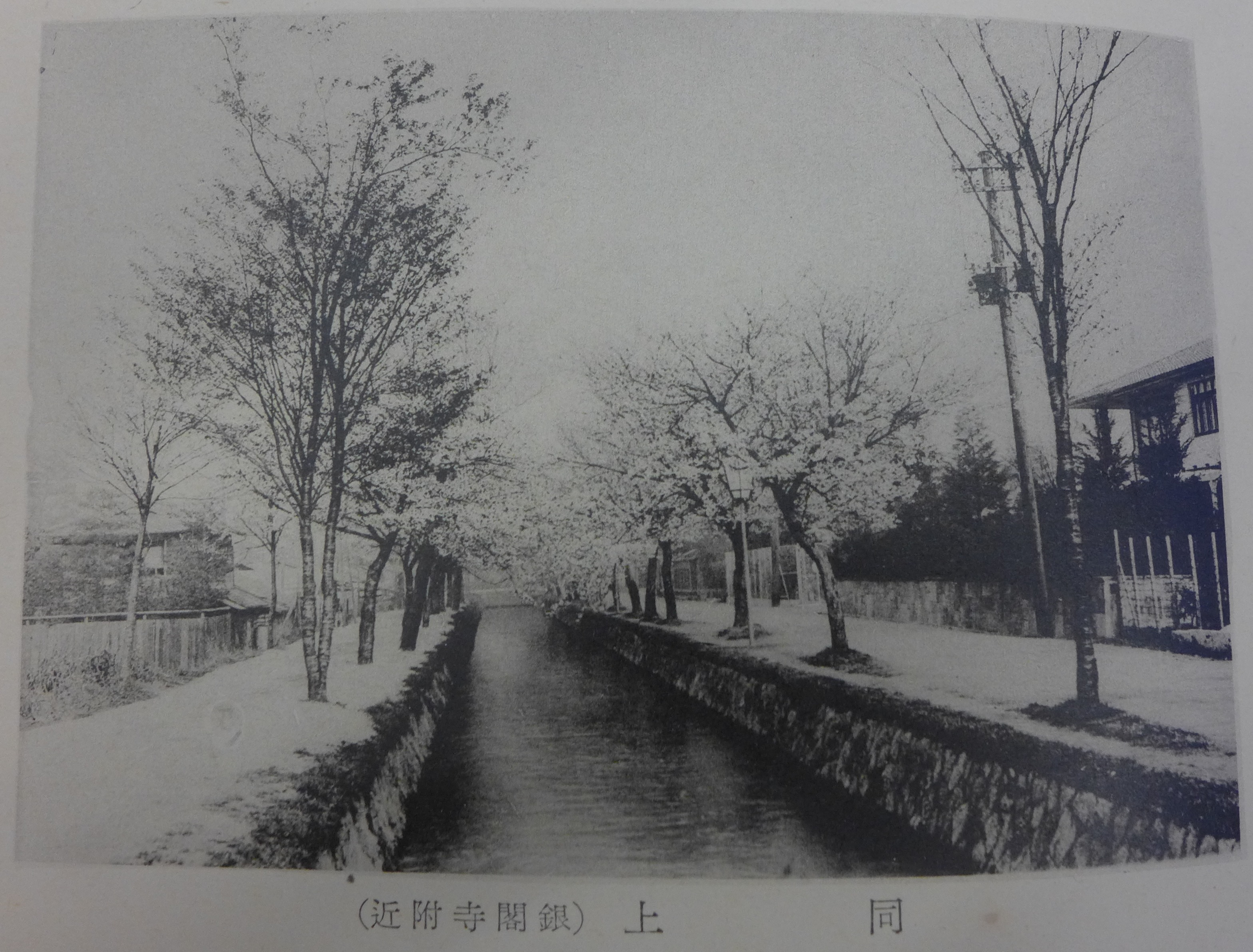
Philosopher's Walk, a branch of the Lake Biwa Canal near Ginkaku-ji

During construction project Chief Engineer Tanabe visited the United States in 1888 to investigate canal based transportation systems. Although canal based transport for commercial goods was found to be only marginally viable, Tanabe also had the opportunity to observe hydropower projects in Lowell and Holyoke, Massachusetts as well as at Aspen, Colorado. After consulting with North American engineers, the idea of building a power station, fashioned after the Aspen hydroelectric plant and utilizing the high head streams available on the Lake Biwa Canal was put into practice.

The first Phase I hydroelectric power station utilizing two 120 HP Pelton turbines and two Edison 80 kW DC generators became operational in August 1891. Subsequent augmentations to the Phase I power station meant that by 1897, 20 turbines were producing 1,760 kW of power through a variety DC and AC generators imported from Siemens of Germany and GE of the United States. In order to make use of the power generated, construction of what was to become Japan's first tram line, the Kyoto Electric Railway (京都電気鉄道, Kyōto Denki Tetsudō), began in 1895.

In 1894 the Kamo River Waterway—started in 1892—was completed, uniting Kamo River and Fushimi ward.

=== Second Canal and Phase II Hydroelectric Power Facility ===
Due to rapidly increasing demand for tap water and electricity, plans were made by Kikujiro Saigo, the second mayor of Kyoto City, for the construction of the second route (Canal No. 2) to be built independent of the first Lake Biwa Canal. Construction work on the second canal was started in October 1908, and was completed in April 1912. With a resulting increase of water intake from 8.3 m3/s to 23.65 m3/s a water treatment plant and upgraded Phase II hydroelectric power plant were also erected. The original Phase I power station was decommissioned, but with the commissioning of the Phase II power station and two additional sub stations, overall generation capacity from the Lake Biwa Canal rose to 6,400 kW by May 1914.

== Route and current usage ==
The waterway runs from the vicinity of Mii-dera in Ōtsu, Shiga to its terminus near Nanzen-ji in Kyoto through a series of tunnels and along concreted irrigation channels around the mountains. Between the two cities, the canal has two principal routes, the Canal No. 1 (第一疏水, Dai-ichi sosui) and the Canal No. 2 (第二疏水, Dai-ni sosui).

Due to the 36 meter difference in elevation between the upstream dam and its terminus, an inclined plane was built, which allowed boats to travel on land via the use of a flat car on which they were placed. Operation of the 9 ft (2,743 mm) track gauge incline ceased in 1948, but part of its structure, known as the Keage Incline, has been preserved and is now a tourist attraction, famous for its ornamental cherry trees.

Following the development of the railway and road infrastructure, the role of the canal as a means of transportation was largely over by the 1940s. From 2018 however, limited passenger boat traffic returned with the opening of the Lake Biwa Canal Cruise on open portions of the main canal between Keage and Ōtsu.

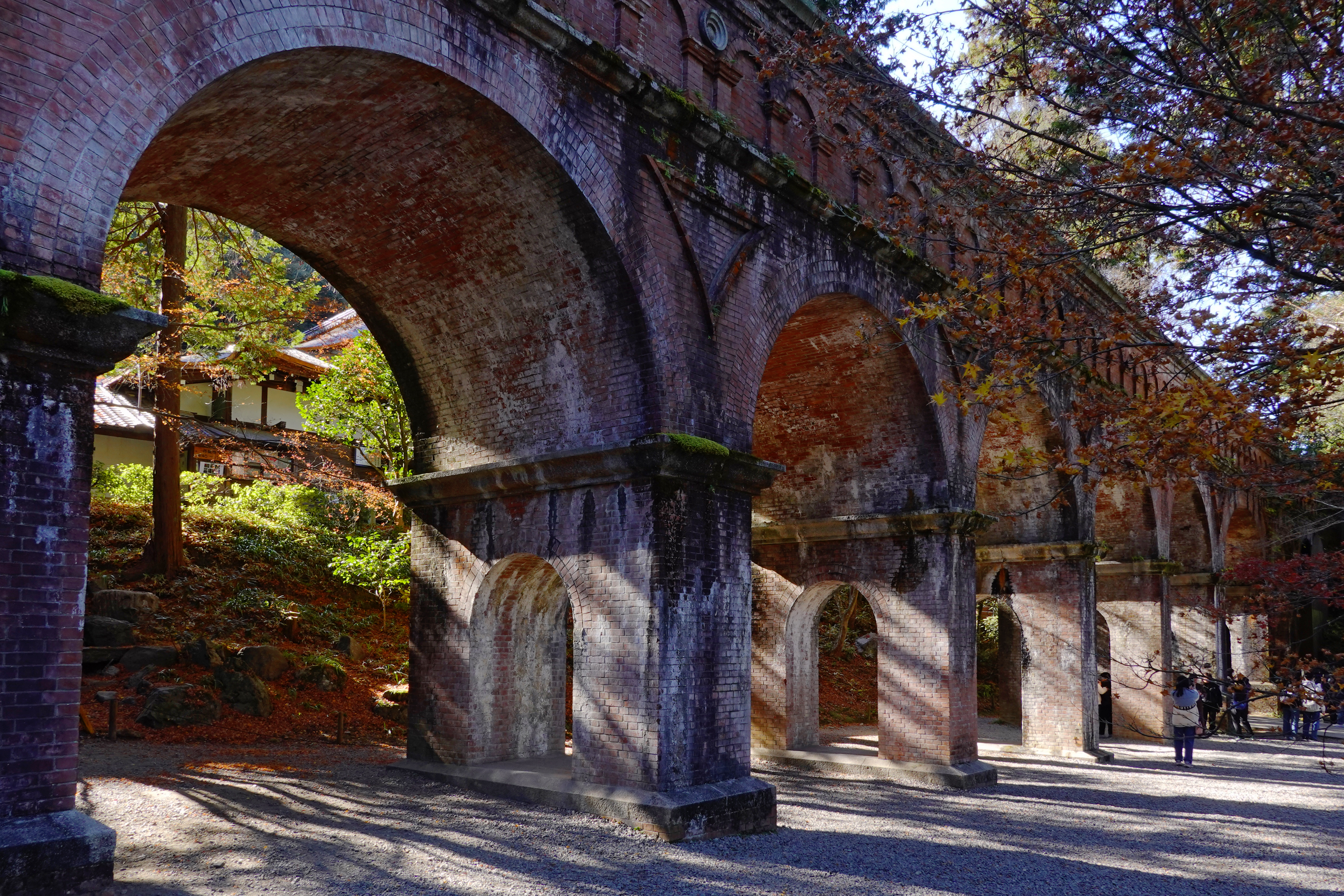
the Nanzen-ji aqueduct

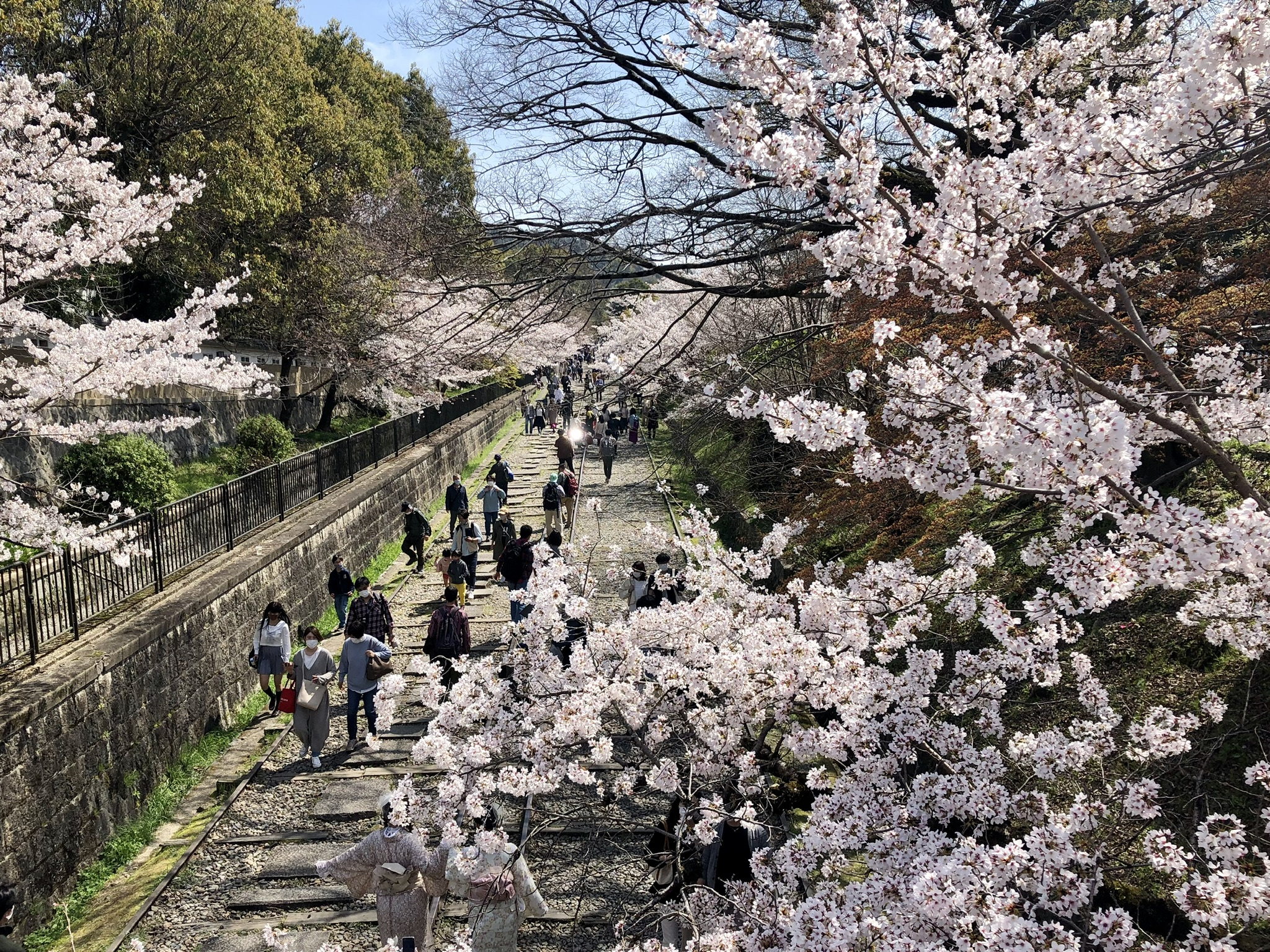
Keage Incline, Spring 2021

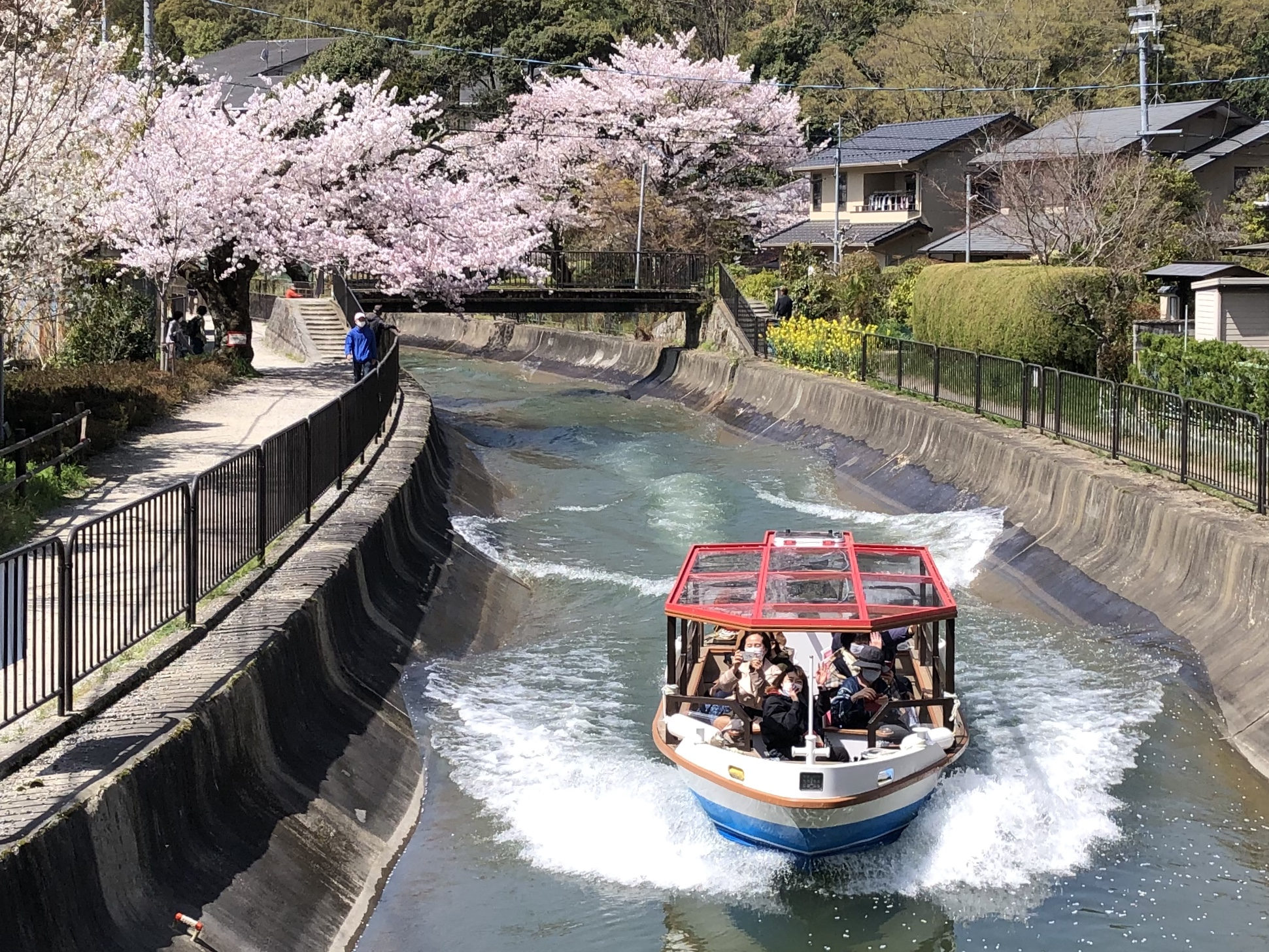
Lake Biwa Canal Cruise at Yamashina, Spring 2021

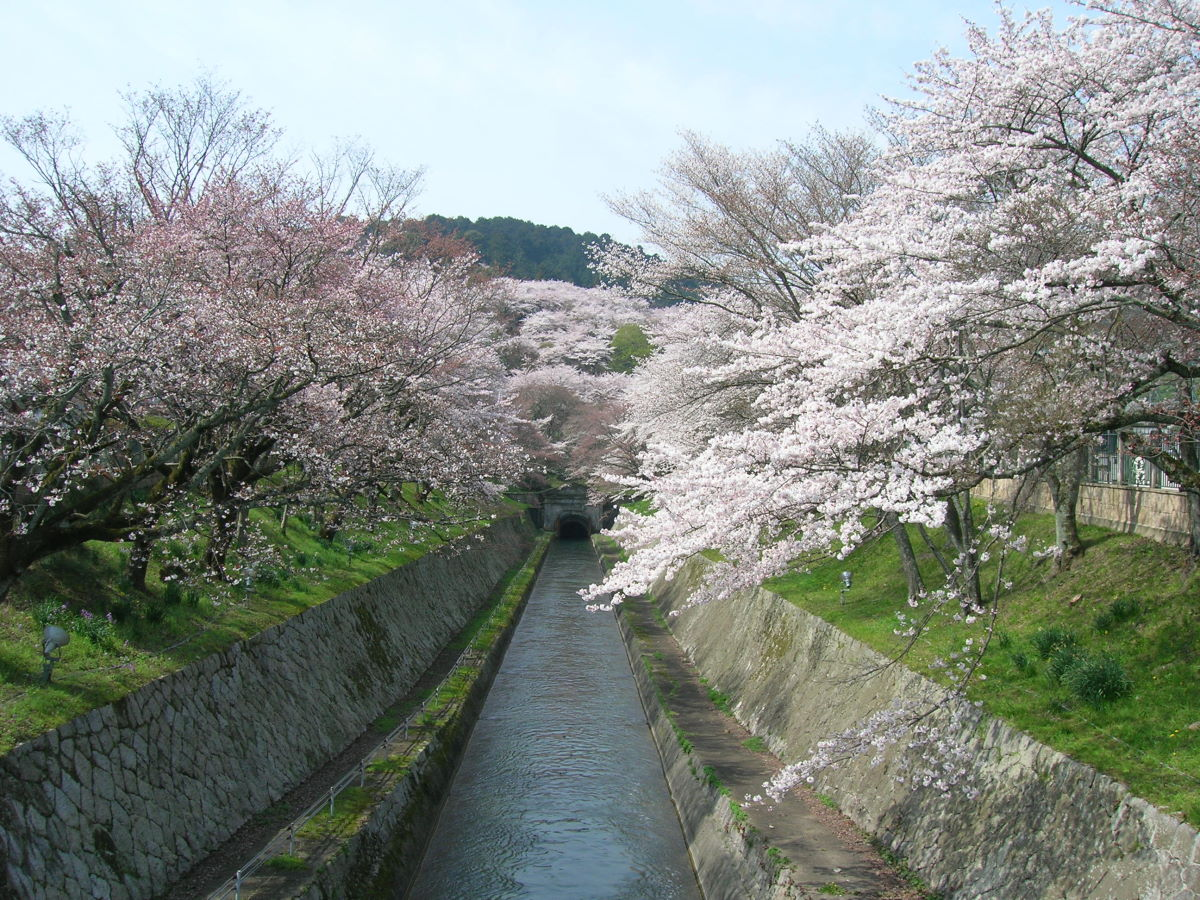
Portal of the first canal tunnel at Ōtsu

== Museum ==
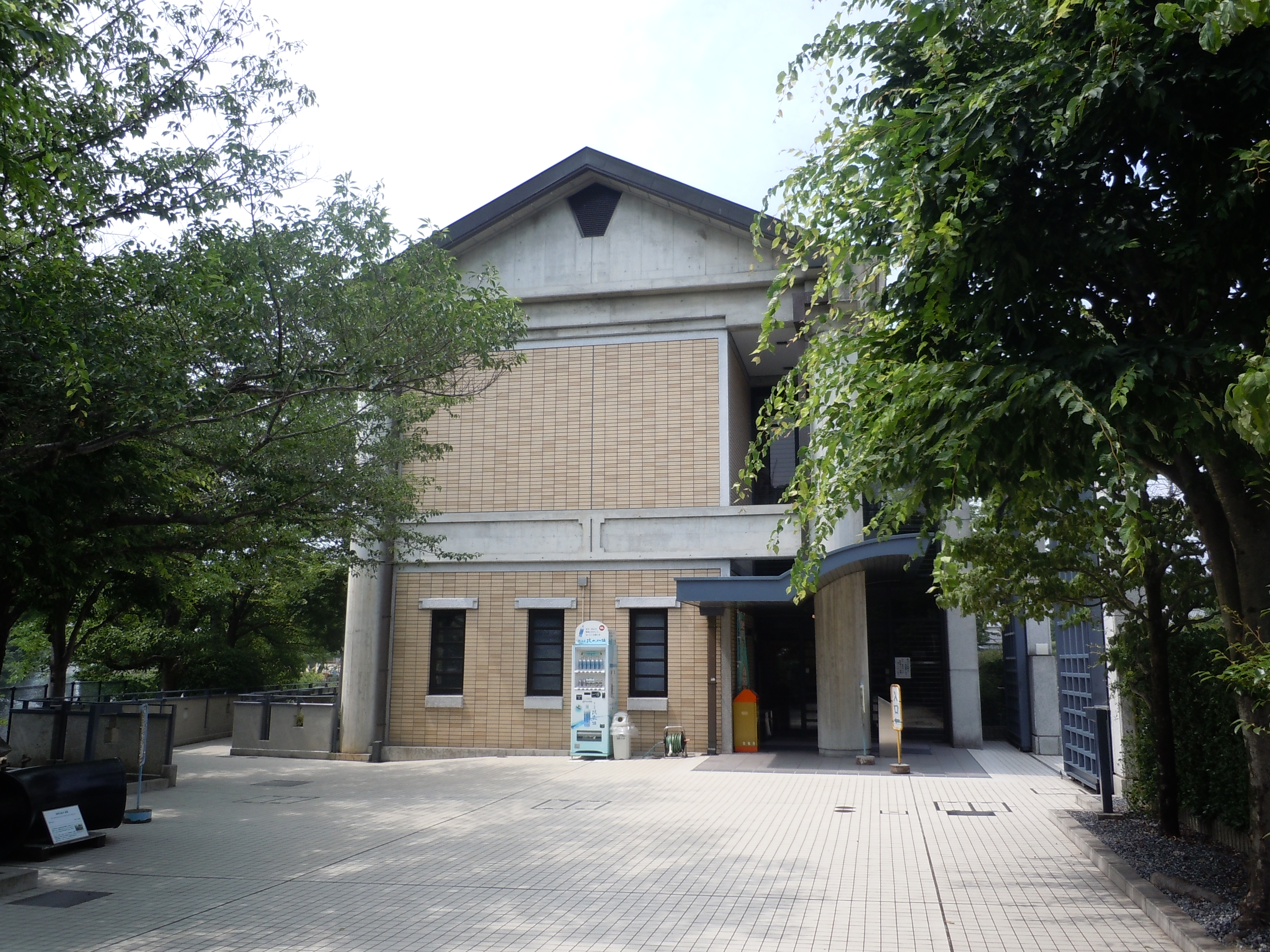
Lake Biwa Canal Museum of Kyoto

In August 1989 the Lake Biwa Canal Museum of Kyoto (琵琶湖疏水記念館, Biwako Sosui Kinenkan) was established to commemorate the centenary of the opening. The museum reopened after renovation in 2009.

== See also ==
- Biwako Quasi-National Park
- The 100 Views of Nature in Kansai
