= Sasaki Takayuki =

Junior First Rank Marquis Sasaki Takayuki
- 佐々木 高行
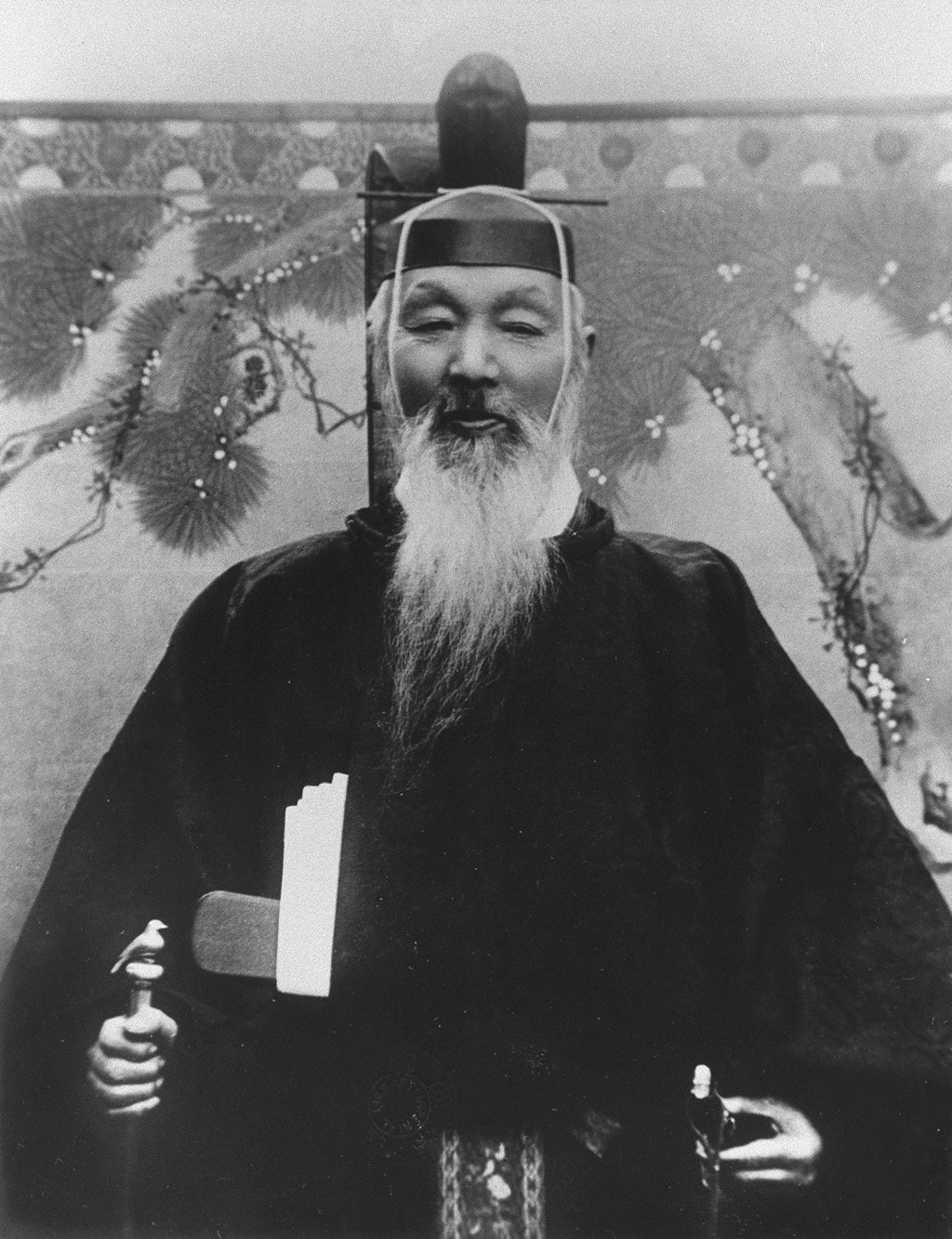
- Marquis Sasaki Takayuki

Lord of Public Works
- In office 21 October 1881 – 22 December 1885
- Monarch: Meiji

Member of the House of Peers
- In office 29 April 1909 – 2 March 1910 Nominated by the Emperor

Member of the Privy Council
- In office 30 April 1888 – 2 March 1910
- Monarch: Meiji

Personal details
- Born: November 26, 1830 Agawa District, Kōchi, Japan
- Died: March 3, 1910 (aged 79) Roppongi, Tokyo, Japan

Marquis Sasaki Takayuki (佐々木 高行; November 26, 1830 – March 3, 1910) was a bureaucrat, government minister and court official in late Meiji period Japan.

== Biography ==
Sasaki was born into a samurai class family in Agawa District, Tosa Domain (in the present-day city of Kōchi, Kōchi Prefecture). He served the Yamauchi clan in several important posts, including kōri-bugyō (country magistrate) and ōmetsuke (inspector). He also supported Sakamoto Ryōma in the Taisei hōkan movement to restore political power to the Emperor of Japan at the expense of the Tokugawa Shogunate. During the Boshin War, he commanded the Kaientai, a paramilitary group of Tosa samurai youths, and occupied the Tokugawa magistrate's office at Nagasaki.

After the Meiji Restoration, Sasaki served the Meiji government as sangi (councilor) and taifu (senior vice minister) of the Ministry of Justice. In 1871, Sasaki was selected to be a member of the Iwakura Mission, and traveled around the globe. On his return, he found that many of his countrymen had quit the government over the Seikanron debate; however, Sasaki chose to remain in the Genrōin as an active member of the new government.

During the Satsuma Rebellion, Sasaki was sent to his native Kōchi to ensure that the rebellion would not spread to the disaffected former samurai in Shikoku. For these efforts, he gained the deep confidence of Emperor Meiji and was appointed as privy councilor as well as one of Emperor Meiji’s chamberlains and close confidant. In 1884, he was elevated to the title of count (hakushaku) in the kazoku peerage system.

Sasaki was later selected to be one of the tutors involved in the education of Crown Prince Haru (the future Emperor Taishō), as well as Emperor Meiji’s daughters, Princesses Masako and Fusako.

In his later years, Sasaki was known for his conservative political views. He was instrumental in the creation of the Jingi-in, the government body heading the State Shinto religion. He was also associated with Nishimura Shigeki in promoting patriotic education and emperor worship in the public school curriculum. He was one of the founders of the Kōgaku-in (later Kokugakuin University). In 1909, he title was elevated to that of marquis (kōshaku). He died in 1910, and his grave is at the Aoyama Cemetery in Tokyo.
