= Lewis Gordon (civil engineer) =

British civil engineer

Professor Lewis Gordon FRSE

Personal details
- Born: Lewis Dunbar Brodie Gordon; 1815 Edinburgh, Scotland
- Died: 28 April 1876 (aged 60–61) Poynter's Grove, Totteridge, Hertfordshire, England
- Occupation: Civil engineer

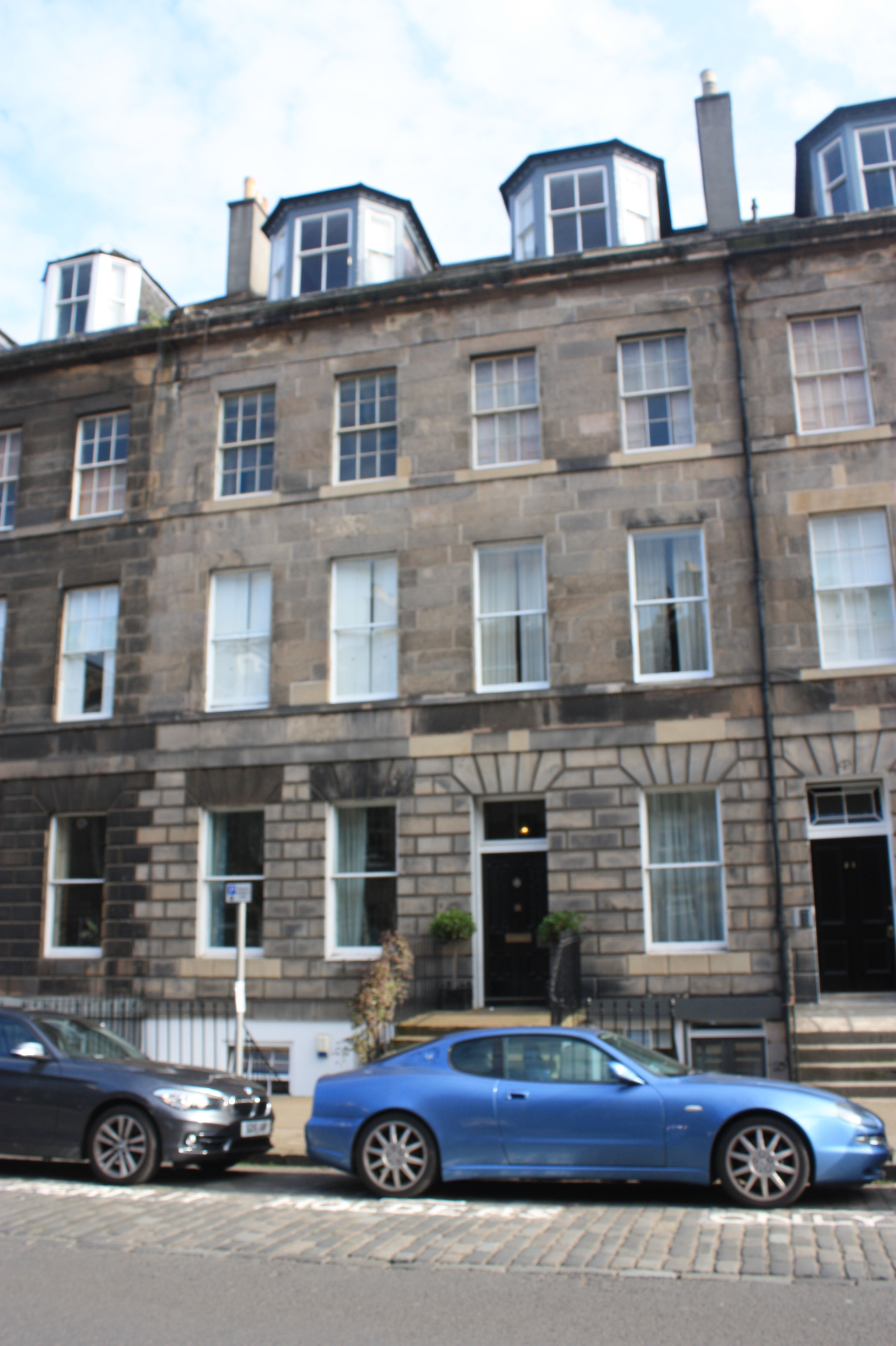
Lewis Gordon's childhood home at 27 London Street, Edinburgh

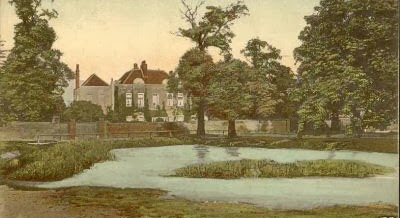
Poynter's Grove, Totteridge, in the early 1900s.

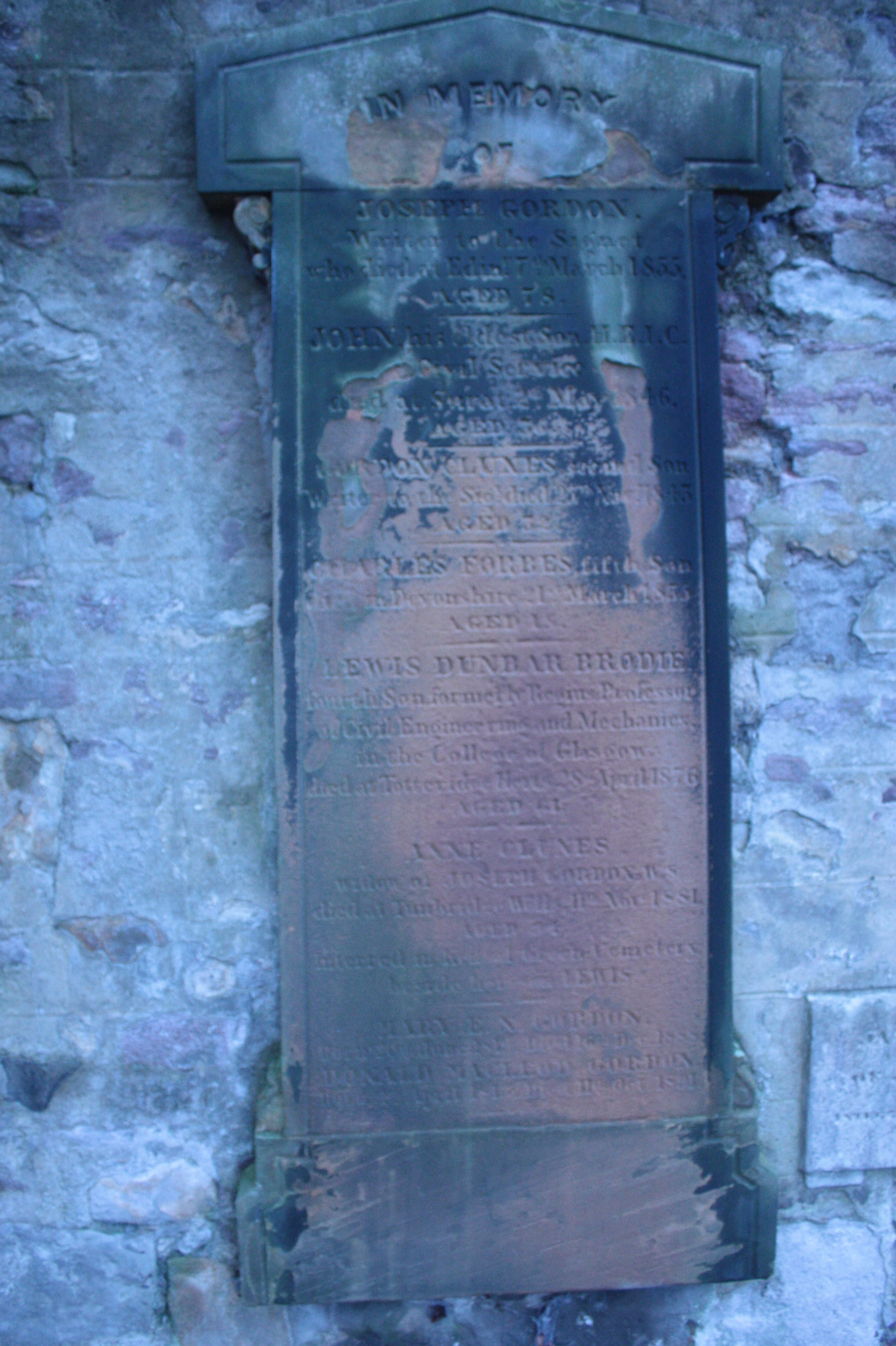
The grave of Lewis Dunbar Brodie Gordon in Greyfriars Kirkyard, Edinburgh

Lewis Dunbar Brodie Gordon (6 March 1815 – 28 April 1876) was a Scottish civil engineer.

== Life ==
He was the fourth son of Anne Clunes (d.1881) and her husband, Joseph Gordon WS, an Edinburgh lawyer. They lived at 27 London Street in Edinburgh's New Town. He was educated at the High School in Edinburgh then went to the University of Edinburgh. A student and assistant to Marc Brunel, during the construction of the Thames Tunnel, he made a career change to mining. Registering as a student at the Freiburg School of Mines, Germany, he then studied further at the École Polytechnique in Paris.

In 1838 he visited the mines at Clausthal, and met Wilhelm Albert. Impressed by what he saw, he wrote to his friend Robert Stirling Newall, urging him to "Invent a machine for making (wire ropes)". On receipt of Gordon's letter, Newall designed a wire rope machine. On Gordon's return to the UK in 1839, he formed a partnership with Newall and Charles Liddell, registering R.S. Newall and Company in Dundee. On 17 August 1840, Newall took out a patent for "certain improvements in wire rope and the machinery for making such rope," and R.S. Newall and Company commenced making wire ropes for "Mining, Railway, Ships' Rigging, and other purposes".

He was Professor of Civil Engineering at the University of Glasgow from 1840 to 1855. In 1845 he was elected a Fellow of the Royal Society of Edinburgh his proposer being James David Forbes.

Gordon became a mentor to the brothers James Thomson and William Thomson, encouraging their interest in the development of a general theory of heat. In 1848 he gave the brothers a copy of French physicist Sadi Carnot's 1824 treatise On the Motive Power of Fire, which William Thomson used to write his first thermodynamics article, "On an Absolute Thermometric Scale Founded on Carnot’s Theory of the Motive Power of Heat" (1848), which founded the absolute temperature scale. Gordon was made an Honorary Member of the Institution of Engineers and Shipbuilders in Scotland in 1859.

He died on 28 April 1876 at Poynter's Grove in Totteridge in Hertfordshire and is buried in the family plot in Greyfriars Kirkyard in central Edinburgh. The grave lies on the western wall of the western extension.

== Family ==
His sister married William Siemens, Carl Wilhelm Siemens, of Siemens & Halske. Gordon's wife was from Hanover and linked by marriage to the Siemens family.
