= Hugh Matheson (industrialist) =

Scottish industrialist (1821–1898)

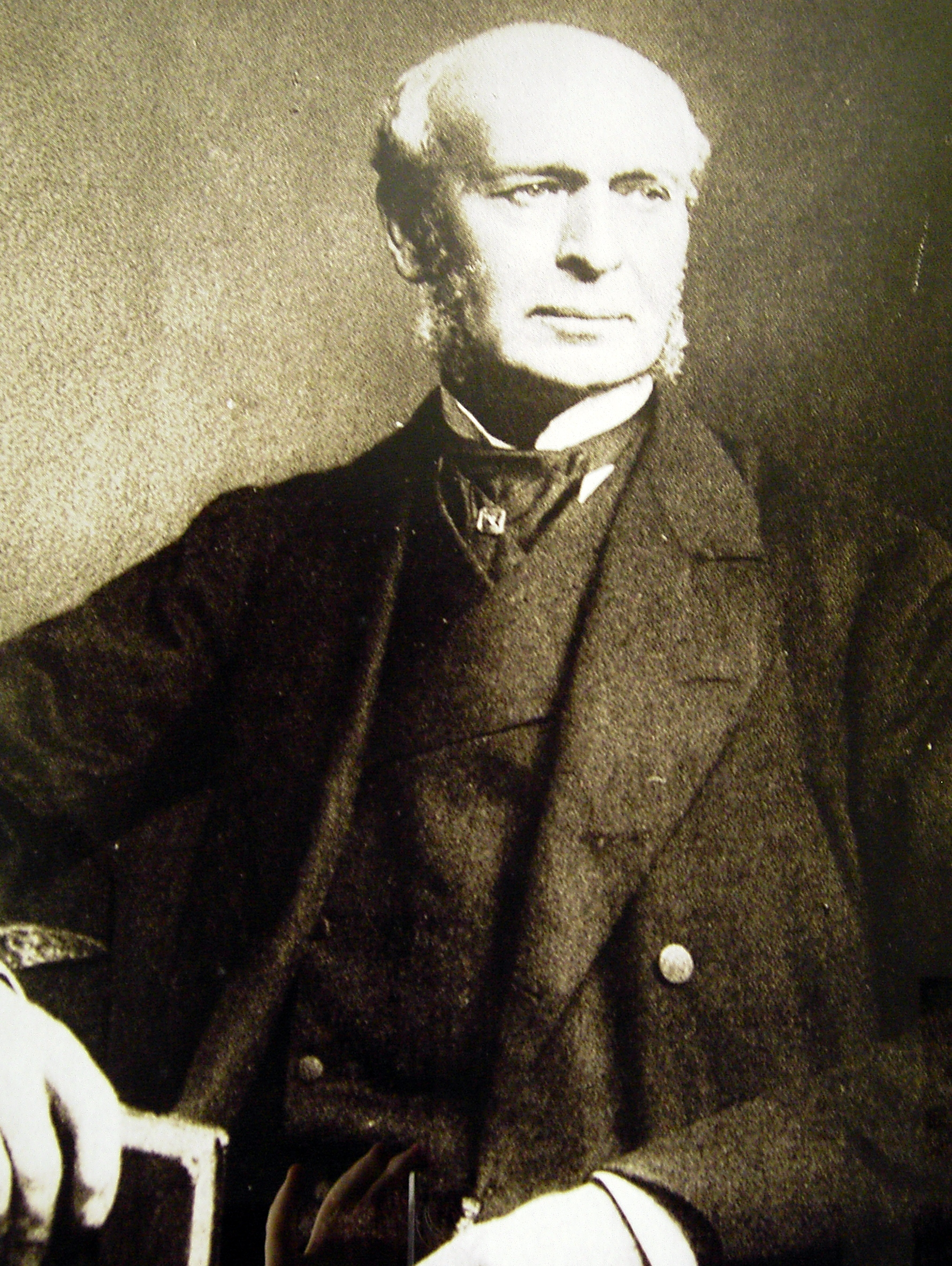
Hugh Matheson

Hugh Mackay Matheson (23 April 1821 – 8 February 1898) was a Scottish industrialist, businessman and minister who was a senior partner in Matheson & Company and founder of the Rio Tinto corporation. He also supported Presbyterian missions to China.

== Early life ==
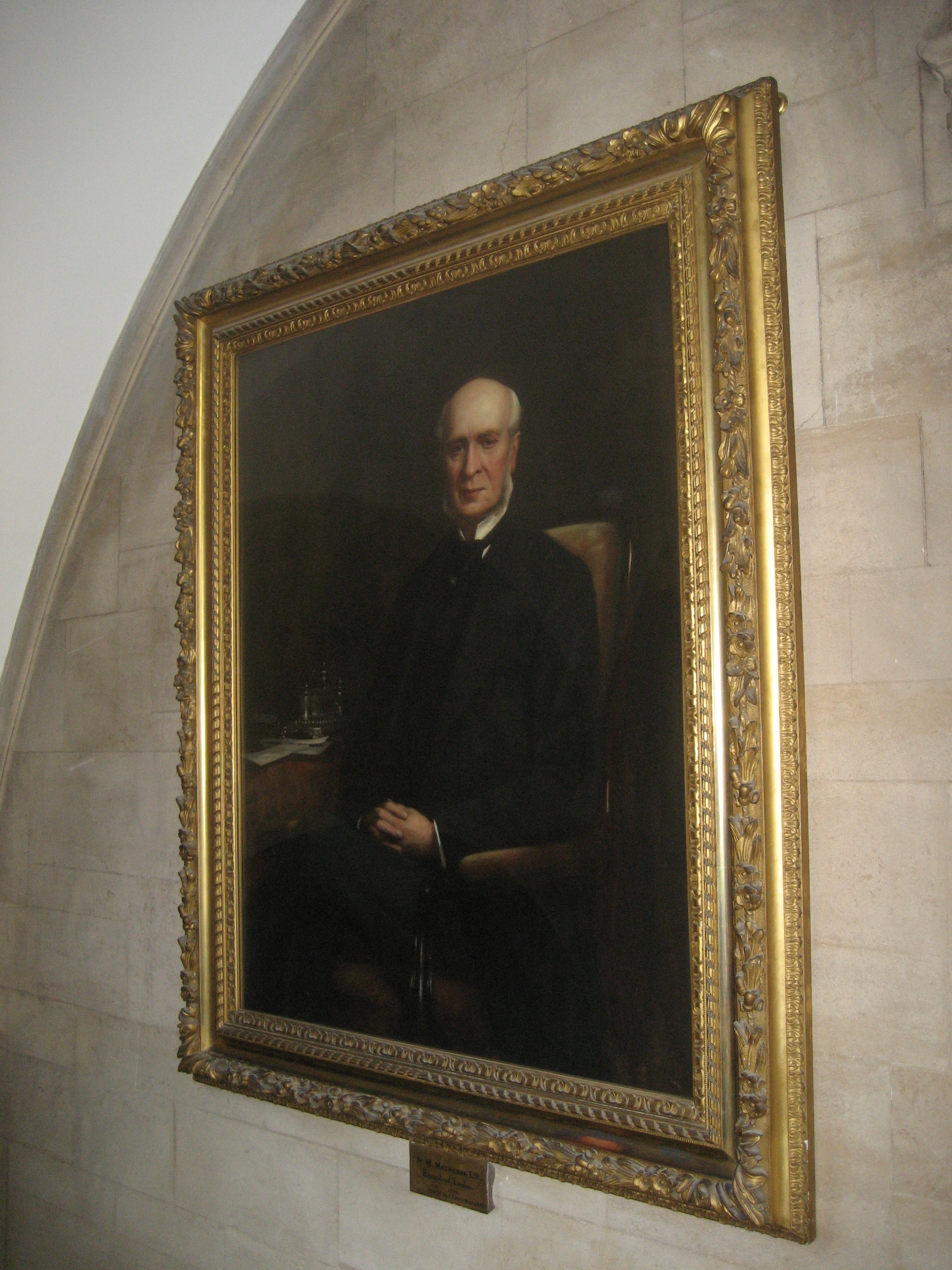
Portrait of Matheson by James Coutts Michie displayed at Westminster College, Cambridge

Hugh Mackay Matheson was born in Edinburgh on 23 April 1821. He was the second son of Duncan Matheson, an advocate at the Scottish bar and Deputy Sheriff of Edinburgh. Educated at the Royal High School, Matheson then served a seven-year commercial apprenticeship at the Glasgow firm James Ewing & Co. During his time in Glasgow, Matheson was an active lay member of the Church of Scotland and the St. Enoch's Sabbath School Society. He played an important role in developing early trading relations with Meiji-era Japan.

In 1843, Matheson declined an offer from his uncle James Matheson to join Jardine Matheson in Hong Kong due to the company's extensive links with the Chinese opium trade. He nonetheless took a new London based corresponding agent role serving the interests of the firm working at Magniac-Jardine and Company to arrange and negotiate the sale of tea, silk and other commodities shipped to England from the Far East. In 1845, Matheson undertook an 18-month tour to India and China in order to be better acquainted with commercial and trading opportunities in those countries.

== Links with Japan ==
In 1863 in his role as senior partner of Matheson and Company he provided an introduction for the Chōshū Five to Alexander William Williamson, Professor of Chemistry at University College, London, enabling the Japanese students to register as non-matriculated students at the university. These five pioneering students went on to take leading roles in the development of the Japanese economy. In their capacities as businessmen and senior government officials they oversaw institutions and government departments that became active customers for British manufactured industrial goods. One of the five students, Itō Hirobumi, subsequently became Japan's first prime minister. On return visit to Britain in 1872 as a part of the Iwakura Mission Itō was to request Matheson's assistance in recruiting British academics to provide instruction at the newly established Tokyo Imperial College of Engineering.

== Rio Tinto Mines purchase ==
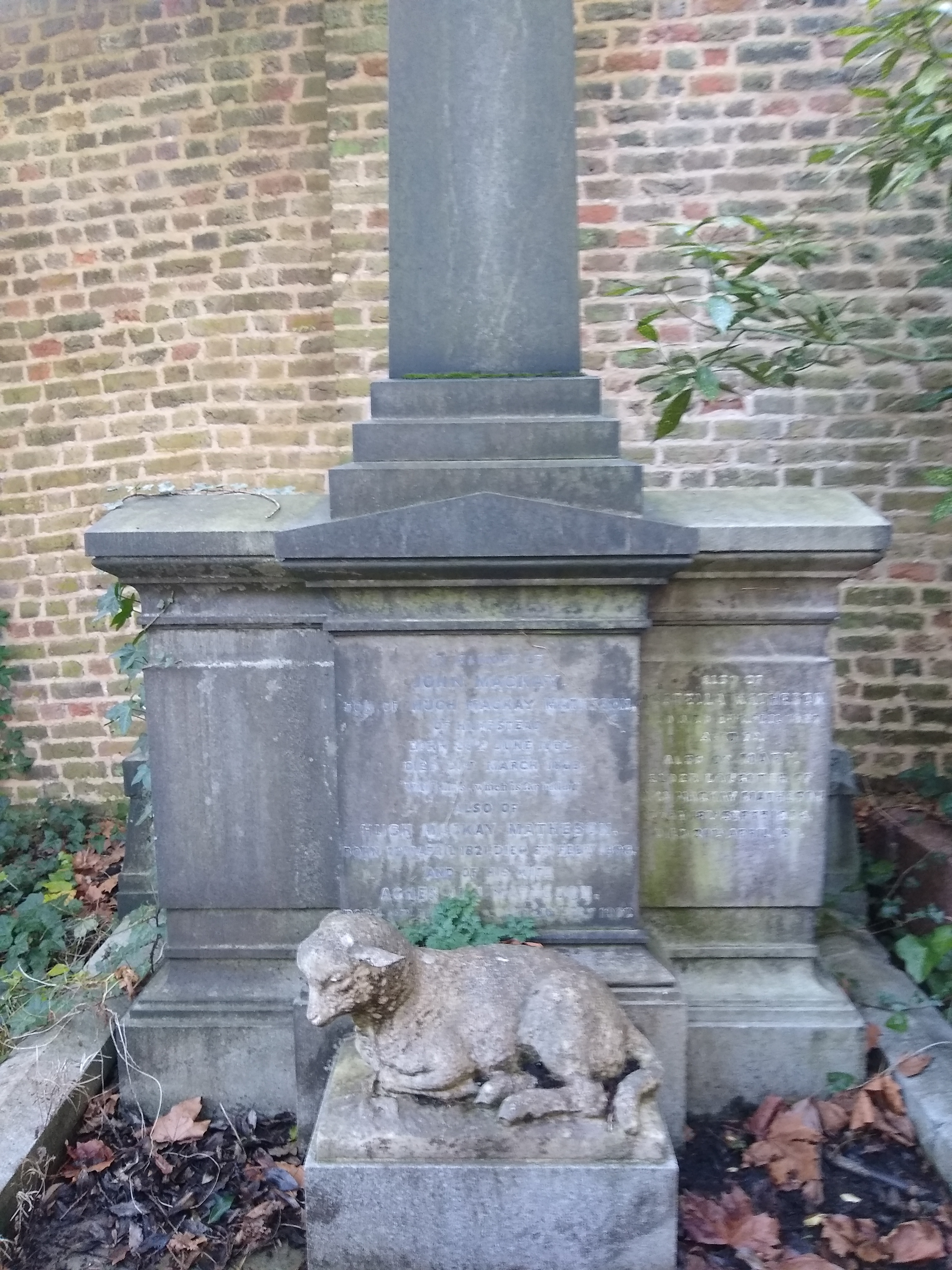
The grave of Hugh Mackay Matheson in Highgate Cemetery

In February 1873, after obtaining an agreement from the Spanish government to sell the Rio Tinto mines in Huelva, Spain, Matheson assembled a financial syndicate to purchase the mining operations. The syndicate was made up of Matheson and Company (24%), Deutsche Bank (56%) and the railway construction company Clark, Punchard (20%). Establishing the company that is today the Rio Tinto Group. Matheson served as the company's first president. Under Matheson, Rio Tinto became the largest copper producer in the world.

A portion of Matheson and Company's original capital for the Rio Tinto purchase came from Jardine and Matheson, a business in which several family members held senior positions.

== Later life ==
Matheson married in 1855 and resided for many years in Hampstead where served as a lay leader of Trinity Presbyterian Church and President of the Hampstead Liberal Club. William Ewart Gladstone, a renowned opponent of the opium Wars in China, was a regular visitor at his Heathlands home. He is buried at Highgate Cemetery (West Side).
