= Edmund Morel (engineer) =

British railway engineer

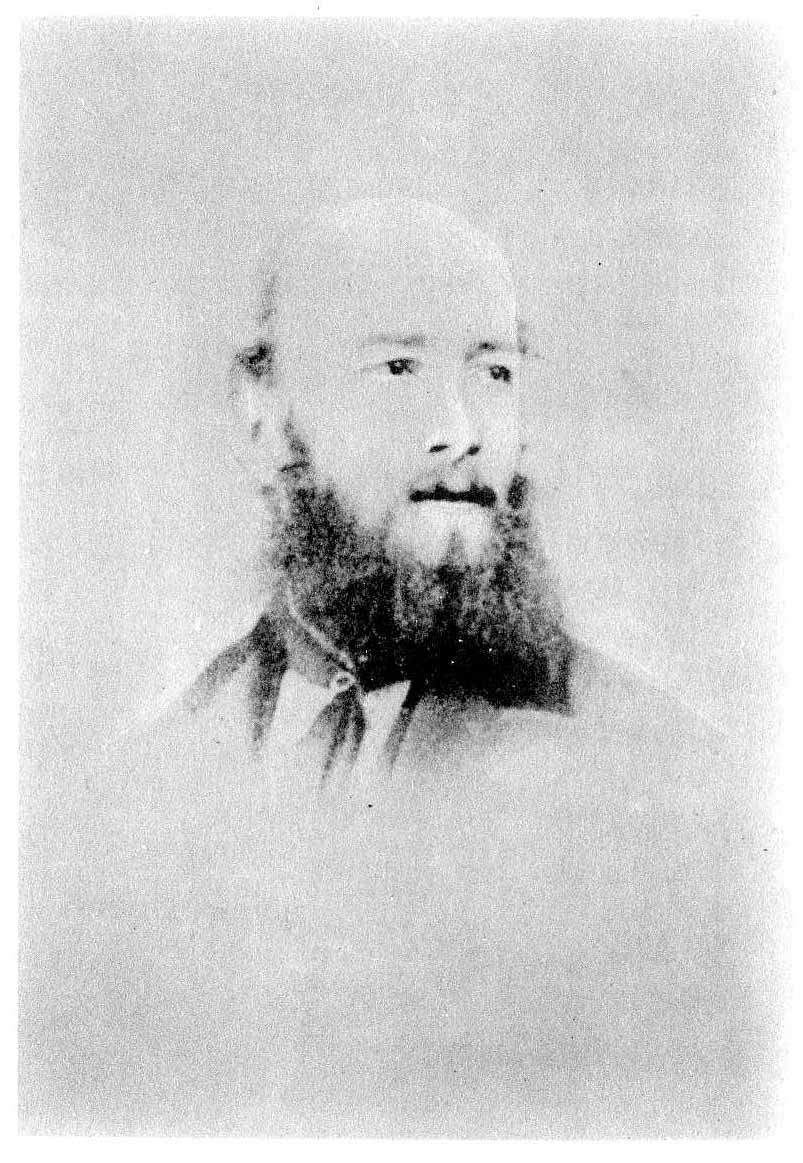
- Edmund Morel
- Born: 17 November 1840; London, UK
- Died: 5 November 1871 (aged 30); Yokohama, Japan
- Resting place: Yokohama Foreign General Cemetery
- Occupation: Civil engineer
- Spouse: Harriett Wynder (1862–1871)

Edmund Morel (17 November 1840 – 5 November 1871) was a British civil engineer who was engaged in railway construction in many countries, including New Zealand, Australia, and Japan. He was the first foreign Engineer-in-Chief appointed by the Japanese government, for guiding and supervising railway construction.

== Biography ==
Morel was born in London on 17 November 1840 (recorded as 1841 on his gravestone). He studied civil engineering at King's College London.

In 1863 Morel was in Melbourne, Australia (see his letters) and between 1862 and 1863, Morel was involved in railway construction in New Zealand followed by a period in Australia between 1864 and 1865.

In 1867, Morel was active in British North Borneo for the Labuan Coal Company, building railways and sinking mining shafts, living at Labuan island, when he was invited to Japan by British envoy Sir Harry Parkes. During his short assignment he made significant proposals to the Japanese government regarding engineering administration and education. The government established the Ministry of Public Works in December 1870 on his advice to integrate the introduction of foreign technologies and their application. Morel designed Japan's first railway, connecting Shimbashi Station in Tokyo with Sakuragichō Station in Yokohama. The locomotives and rails were imported from England. Through discussions with Itō Hirobumi and Ōkuma Shigenobu, Morel advised on what industries and technologies were necessary for Japan to build railways, and through discussions Japan's standard gauge of 1,067 mm (3 ft 6 in) was established. During poor weather when work on the line was not possible, he took his Japanese engineers and surveyors into his house for lectures.

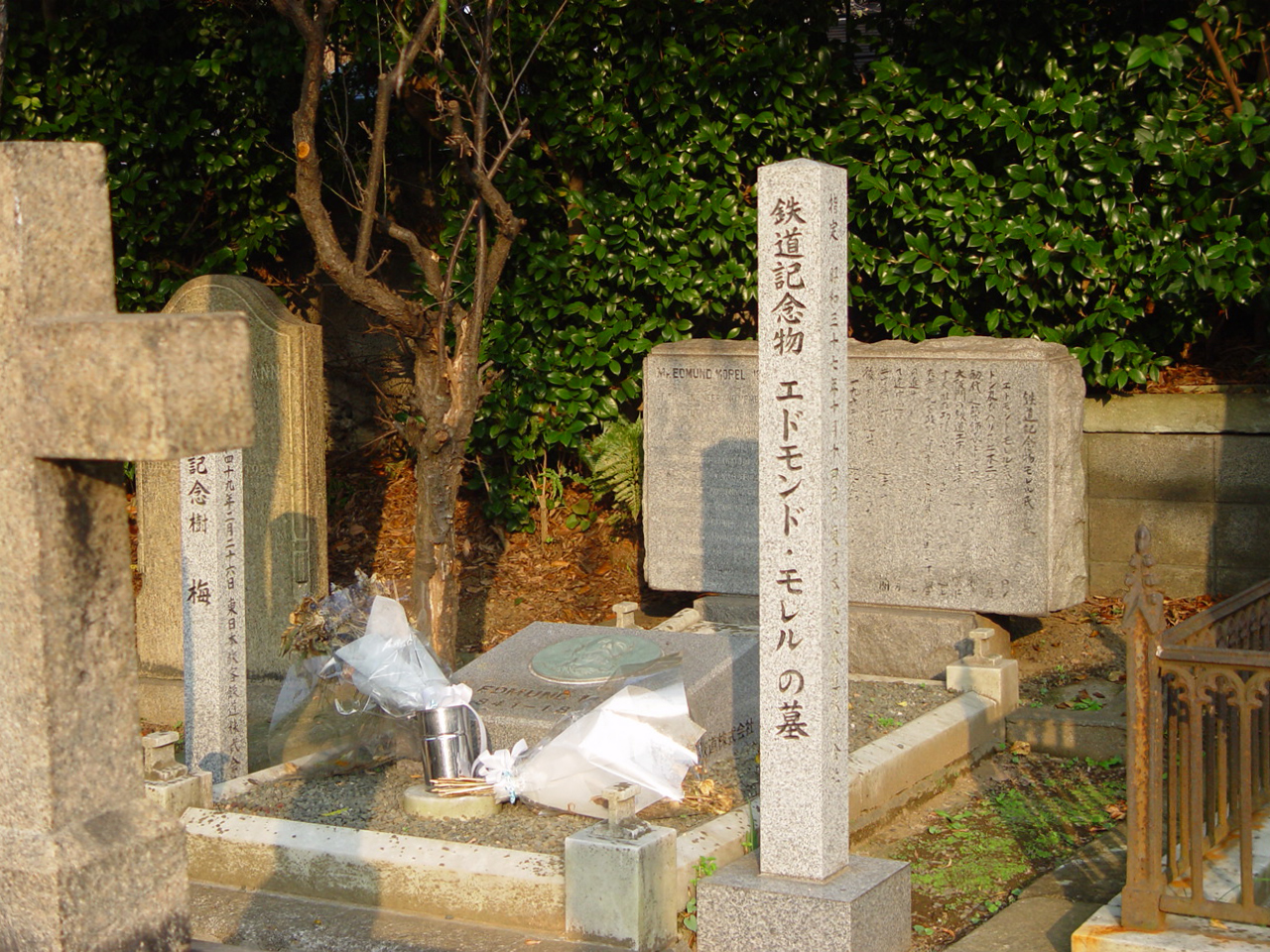
Morel's grave in Yokohama

Morel suffered from tuberculosis before his arrival in Japan, and as his condition worsened he resigned his post with the intention of going to India. He received a 5,000 yen reward from the Japanese government, a tremendous amount at the time. However, he died in Yokohama on 5 November 1871, shortly before the opening ceremonies for the railway. His grave in the Foreigner's Cemetery in Naka-ku, Yokohama is designated as a "national railway memorial". A bronze bust outside Sakuragichō Station commemorates his work.

Morel's wife was long reported to have been Japanese, but this was made up by a novelist to make Morel's story more interesting: he married Harriett Wynder, an Englishwoman, on 4 February 1862 at St Pancras Church in London. She died in Yokohama on 6 November 1871, the day after Morel, from acute nervous or respiratory disease.

== See also ==
Oyatoi gaikokujin, hired foreigners in Japan
