= AvaTrade =

Multi-asset brokerage company

- Type: Private
- Industry: Financial services
- Founded: June 2006; 20 years ago
- Founders: Emanuel Kronitz; Negev Nosatzki
- Headquarters: Dublin, Ireland
- Key people: Dáire Ferguson (CEO)
- Services: Online brokerage
- Number of employees: 450 (2025)
- Website: www.avatrade.com

AvaTrade is a privately held online brokerage group headquartered in Dublin, Ireland. Founded in 2006 as AvaFX by Emanuel Kronitz and Negev Nosatzki, it offers trading in the foreign exchange market, contracts for difference (CFDs), commodities, stock market indexes, shares, exchange-traded funds, options, futures, cryptocurrencyies, and bonds through its trading platforms and mobile apps.

The group operates through separately regulated entities in the European Economic Area and other jurisdictions and expanded internationally through acquisitions during the 2010s. Its entities have also been subject to regulatory enforcement actions and settlements in several jurisdictions.

== History ==
AvaTrade was established in 2006 by Emanuel Kronitz and Negev Nosatzki and began trading in January 2007 under the AvaFX brand, initially focusing on foreign-exchange trading. The group expanded partly through acquisitions, buying Japanese broker Art Co. in 2010, acquiring the non-US clients of eForex and the non-EU customer accounts of Finotec Trading UK in 2011, and acquiring the Australian customer accounts of YouTradeFX in 2014. In April 2013, AvaFX was renamed AvaTrade as the company expanded its offering beyond foreign exchange trading.

In July 2015, Playtech agreed to acquire AvaTrade for $105 million. The Central Bank of Ireland opposed the transaction, and Playtech appealed the decision. An Irish Financial Services Appeals Tribunal found an error in the Central Bank's decision-making process and referred the matter back to the regulator, but Playtech withdrew from the acquisition in December 2015.

In March 2021, Sky News reported that AvaTrade had hired JPMorgan and Jefferies to prepare for a possible listing on the London Stock Exchange, with an expected valuation of between £500 million and £700 million. In 2024, the company launched AvaFutures, a platform providing retail investors with access to exchange-traded futures contracts.

== Ownership and finances ==
AvaTrade is privately held. When Ava Financial Ltd was established in 2006, founders Emanuel Kronitz and Negev Nosatzki collectively held approximately 66.5% of the company and Clal Finance held approximately 33.5%. Clal sold half of its stake in October 2009 and its remaining 16.5% in June 2010. The latter stake was acquired by Kronitz and Nosatzki for $6.5 million. By June 2025, Kronitz and Nosatzki each held 35% of AvaTrade, while minority shareholders included Shuki Abramovich, Moshik Lipetz and businessman Ilan Calic, each with a 5% stake. That month, an investor group led by Israeli businessman Zvika Barinboim sought regulatory approval for a transaction that would give it approximately 50% of the company at a valuation of $400–500 million. Kronitz was expected to sell his 35% stake, while Nosatzki was expected to increase his holding.

In 2014, the Ava Group generated revenue of $69.9 million, EBITDA of $24.6 million and pre-tax profit of $24.3 million. By 2025, its annual EBITDA was estimated at approximately $90 million.

== Regulation ==
AvaTrade operates through separately regulated entities in a number of jurisdictions. In the European Economic Area, its principal investment firm is authorised by the Central Bank of Ireland (CBI) under MiFID and provides services in other EEA countries under cross-border arrangements, including through a branch in Poland. AvaTrade also operates through a separately licensed investment firm in Cyprus regulated by the Cyprus Securities and Exchange Commission.

Outside the EEA, AvaTrade entities are regulated by the British Virgin Islands Financial Services Commission, the Australian Securities and Investments Commission, South Africa's Financial Sector Conduct Authority, Japan's Financial Services Agency, the Financial Services Regulatory Authority of the Abu Dhabi Global Market, Kenya's Capital Markets Authority, and the Israel Securities Authority.

In Canada, AvaTrade provides its trading technology through Friedberg Direct, whose parent company is regulated as an investment dealer by the Canadian Investment Regulatory Organization; AvaTrade does not own or control the dealer.

== Controversies ==
In 2013, an Israeli court ruled that a lawsuit brought against AvaTrade could be heard in Israel despite a contractual clause providing for jurisdiction in the United Kingdom. The court held that the foreign-jurisdiction clause was prejudicial to Israeli customers and could discourage them from pursuing legal claims. In 2014, the Tel Aviv District Economic Court rejected a claim that ATrade's business model created an inherent conflict of interest in which customer losses necessarily constituted gains for the company.

In March 2014, the Central Bank of Ireland reprimanded Ava Capital Markets Limited (later renamed AVA Trade EU Limited) and fined it €165,000 for breaches of MiFID transaction-reporting requirements. The regulator found that between February 2010 and December 2011 the company had submitted late or inaccurate reports on 523,389 transactions and had inadequate compliance, information-system and outsourcing controls.

In May 2017, the Israel Securities Authority (ISA) fined AvaTrade's local subsidiary NIS 150,000 over a promotional video that it found could mislead clients about regulatory protection and the risks of trading CFDs. In August 2017, Belgium's Financial Services and Markets Authority (FSMA) reached a €175,000 settlement with AVA Trade EU Limited for offering CFDs without the required prospectus and distributing related materials without prior regulatory approval. The company also agreed to allow Belgian clients to terminate their contracts without charge and recover their account balances.

In January 2019, the ISA fined ATrade NIS 576,000 for failing to carry out required reconciliations and controls over client funds and to obtain a required external-auditor report. In July, ATrade admitted allowing clients to open transactions in instruments not permitted under its licence and agreed to a NIS 500,000 penalty, a further conditional NIS 500,000 penalty for two years, and an externally reviewed compliance programme.

In 2019, Ava Trade reached settlements with securities regulators in Saskatchewan and Ontario over unregistered activity. In Saskatchewan, it admitted registration breaches related to an online trading platform operated between 2015 and 2018 and agreed to reimburse C$143,573.69 to 40 investors and pay a C$7,500 administrative penalty. The following month, the Ontario Securities Commission approved a settlement under which Ava Trade admitted unregistered trading and distributing CFDs without a prospectus, paid a C$550,000 penalty and C$25,000 in costs, and disgorged approximately C$3.7 million in revenue. In January 2020, it also settled with the Alberta Securities Commission, admitting that it had acted as a dealer without registration and agreeing to pay C$30,000 and disgorge C$213,428.

In June 2022, the Financial Services Regulatory Authority of the Abu Dhabi Global Market fined Ava Trade Middle East Limited AED 119,000 and ordered remedial measures for breaches of the Common Reporting Standard, including deficiencies in client tax-residency checks, record keeping and regulatory reporting.

In May 2024, Japanese regulators took action against Ava Trade Japan K.K. after the Securities and Exchange Surveillance Commission (SESC) found that falsified customer data had been used in mandatory stress tests. After results deteriorated in 2021, the company's president asked the parent company to conduct the tests using altered data, resulting in inaccurate reports and a failure to take required measures. The Kanto Local Finance Bureau issued a business improvement order requiring an overhaul of compliance and internal controls; TV Asahi reported that it was the first such action under Japan's stress-testing regime. In September, the Financial Futures Association of Japan imposed a ¥7 million penalty over the same conduct.
