= SESC =

SESC may refer to:

- Serviço Social do Comércio, a Brazilian non-profit organization
- Securities and Exchange Surveillance Commission, a Japanese financial regulatory organization
- Southeast Education Service Center, a non-profit organization in Utah, U.S.
- SESC-Pompeia (São Paulo Metro), a future station of the São Paulo Metro, Brazil
