= ADBI =

ADBI may refer to:

- Asian Development Bank Institute
- A synthetic musk
