= Kasumigaseki Common Gate =

Coordinates: 35.6716°N 139.7485°E

- 霞が関コモンゲート
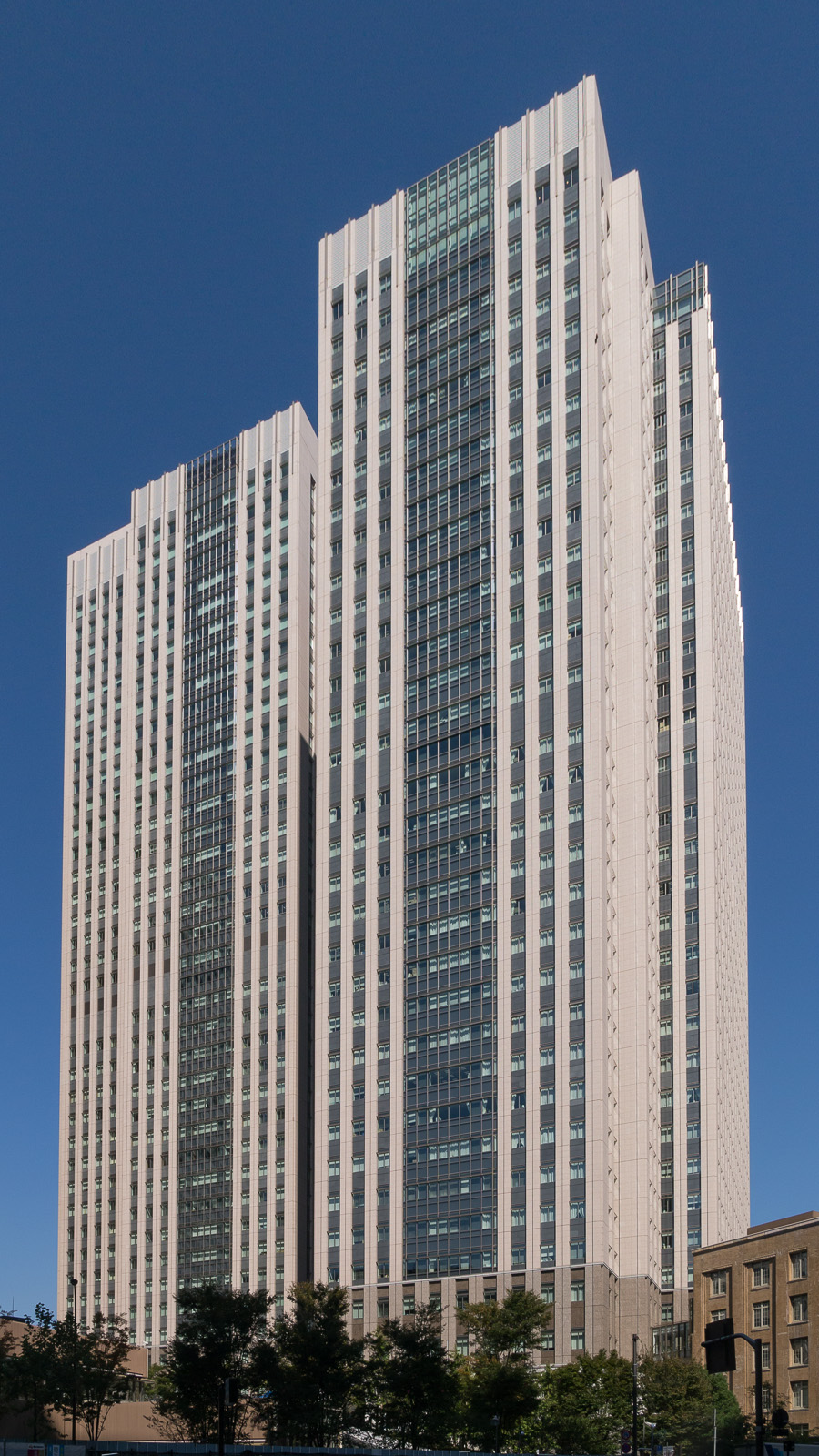
- Interactive map of the Kasumigaseki Common Gate area

General information
- Status: Completed
- Type: Mixed-use
- Location: 3-2-1 Kasumigaseki; Chiyoda, Tokyo, Japan
- Construction started: January 2005
- Completed: 2007
- Opening: October 2007

Height
- Roof: 176 meters (577 ft)

Technical details
- Floor count: 38 above ground 3 below ground

Design and construction
- Architects: Kume Kensetsu, Taisei Corporation, Nippon Steel
- Structural engineer: Taisei Corporation, Nippon Steel, Nihon Densetsu, Mitsubishi Heavy Industries

The Kasumigaseki Common Gate (霞が関コモンゲート, Kasumigaseki Komon Geito) are twin tower buildings located in Kasumigaseki, Chiyoda, Tokyo, Japan. The buildings consist of East Tower and West Tower. Together with the adjacent Kasumigaseki Building, the first modern office skyscraper in Japan, the twin towers are landmarks in the Toranomon and Kasumigaseki area. The buildings are directly connected to Toranomon Station of Tokyo Metro Ginza Line.

== East Tower ==
East Tower is owned by the Japanese Government and is occupied by Ministry of Education, Culture, Sports, Science and Technology and Board of Audit. The building is 33 stories or 156 meters high and the total floor area is 114,600 square meters.

== West Tower ==
The Japanese Government and private sectors co-own West Tower. The lower half of the building is a governmental floors and is occupied by Financial Services Agency. Major tenants of the upper half are Teijin, Daiwa SB Investment, Aichi University Tokyo Office, Toho Tenax, MODEC, Tokuyama Corporation, K&L Gates Tokyo Office, Sugimura & Partners, and Kazan Kai (one of the co-owners). The building is 38 stories or 176 meters high and the total floor area is 118,700 square meters.
