= JFSA =

JFSA may refer to:

- Financial Services Agency of Japan
- Justice for Subpostmasters Alliance, involved in overcoming the British Post Office scandal
