= Komai =

Komai (written: 駒井) is a Japanese surname. Notable people with the surname include:

- Tetsu Komai (駒井 哲, 1894–1970), Japanese-American actor
- Yoshiaki Komai (駒井 善成, born 1992), Japanese footballer
- Kenichiro Komai (駒井 健一郎, Komai Ken'ichirō, 1900-1986), Japanese businessman, 3rd president of Hitachi
