= Network of Asian River Basin Organizations =

The Network of Asian River Basin Organizations (NARBO), established in 2003 and active since February 2004, works to bring Integrated Water Resources Management in river basins throughout the Asia-Pacific region. When it was established, 43 institutions signed up for NARBO, and it has since grown to include 65 institutions, of which 22 are River Basin Organizations, 17 Government Organizations, 17 Regional Knowledge Partners, 17 Inter Regional Knowledge Partners and 8 Development Cooperation Agencies. The organization has its headquarters in Japan.

The first chairperson is Dr. M. Basuki Hadimuljono from the Ministry of Public Works, Indonesia and Vice chairperson is Dr. M.U.A. Tennakoon from Mahaweli Authority of Sri Lanka. The secretariats are composed by the Japan Water Agency (JWA), Asian Development Bank (ADB) and Asian Development Bank Institute (ADBI).
