= Nippon Cargo Airlines =

Japanese cargo airline

Nippon Cargo Airlines Co., Ltd. 日本貨物航空株式会社 Nippon Kamotsu Kōkū Kabushiki-gaisha

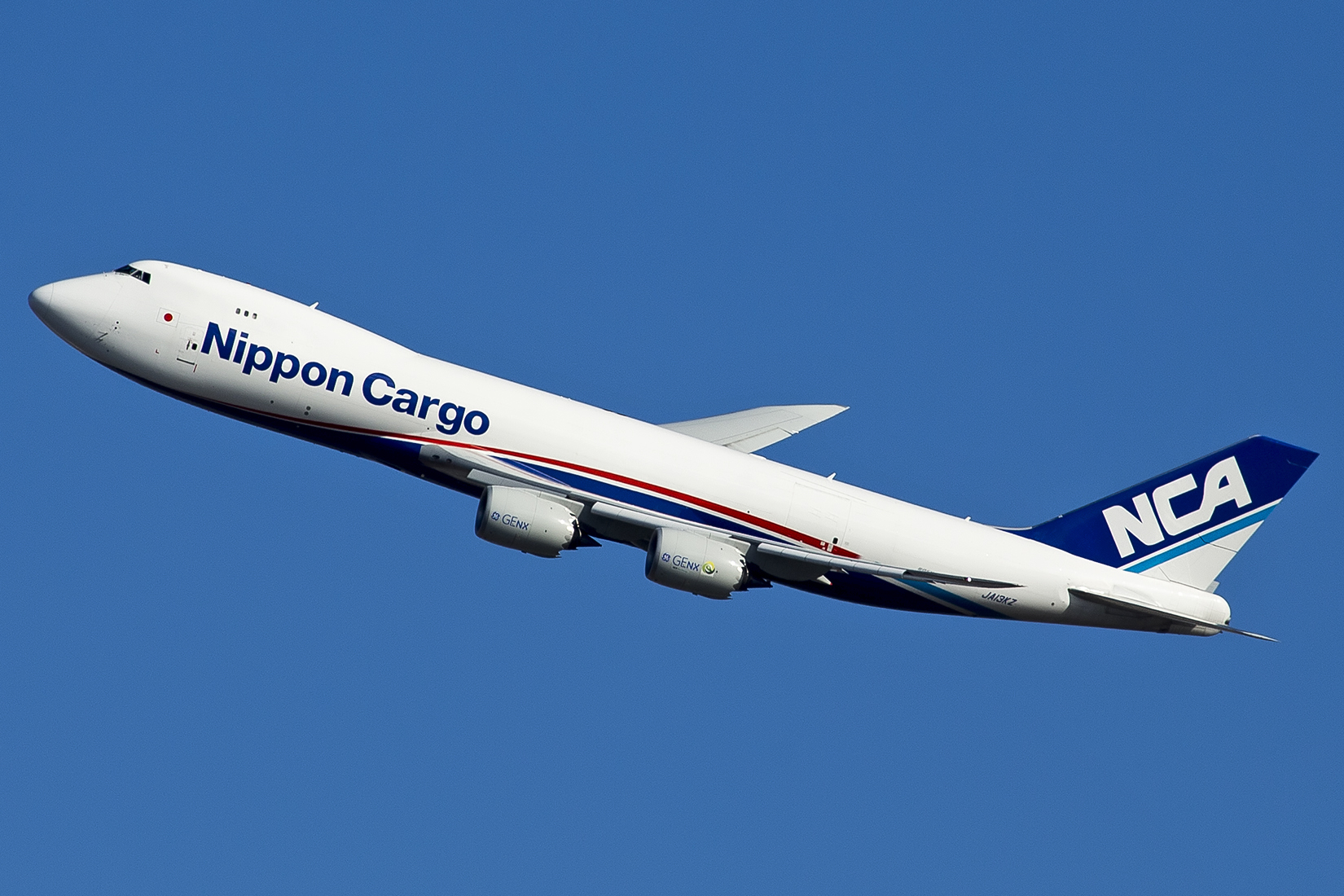
- Nippon Cargo Airlines Boeing 747-8F in 2013
IATA	ICAO	Call sign
KZ	NCA	NIPPON CARGO
- Founded: September 27, 1978; 47 years ago
- Commenced operations: May 8, 1985; 41 years ago
- Hubs: Naha; Osaka–Kansai; Tokyo–Narita
- Fleet size: 8
- Destinations: 20
- Parent company: ANA Holdings Inc.
- Headquarters: Narita International Airport; Narita, Chiba Prefecture, Japan
- Key people: Tetsufumi Otsuki (President & CEO)
- Website: www.nca.aero

Nippon Cargo Airlines (NCA) is a Japanese cargo airline with its head office on the property of Narita International Airport in Narita, Chiba Prefecture, outside Tokyo. It operates scheduled cargo services in Asia and to Europe and North America. Its main base is Narita Airport.

== History ==
Nippon Cargo Airlines was established on September 27, 1978 (its head office was initially a single room inside All Nippon Airways' space at the Kasumigaseki Building) and started operations on May 8, 1985. It was Japan's first all-cargo airline. Over time, their network has grown to include many cities on three continents. Initially, NCA was a joint venture of shipping companies headed by Nippon Yusen and All Nippon Airways (ANA). In August 2005, ANA sold its stake to Nippon Yusen.

The airline is owned by Nippon Yusen (100%). In March 2023, ANA announced plans to acquire NCA from Nippon Yusen to enhance ANA's freight operations. The deal was delayed due to international regulatory concerns.

In December 2010, NCA was selected to provide ground support services for the Japanese Air Force One aircraft, replacing Japan Airlines which was then in the process of retiring its 747 fleet.

On August 1, 2025, ANA Holdings Inc. finalized the acquisition of all shares of Nippon Cargo Airlines from Nippon Yusen through a simplified share exchange.

== Corporate affairs ==
=== Headquarters and major offices ===
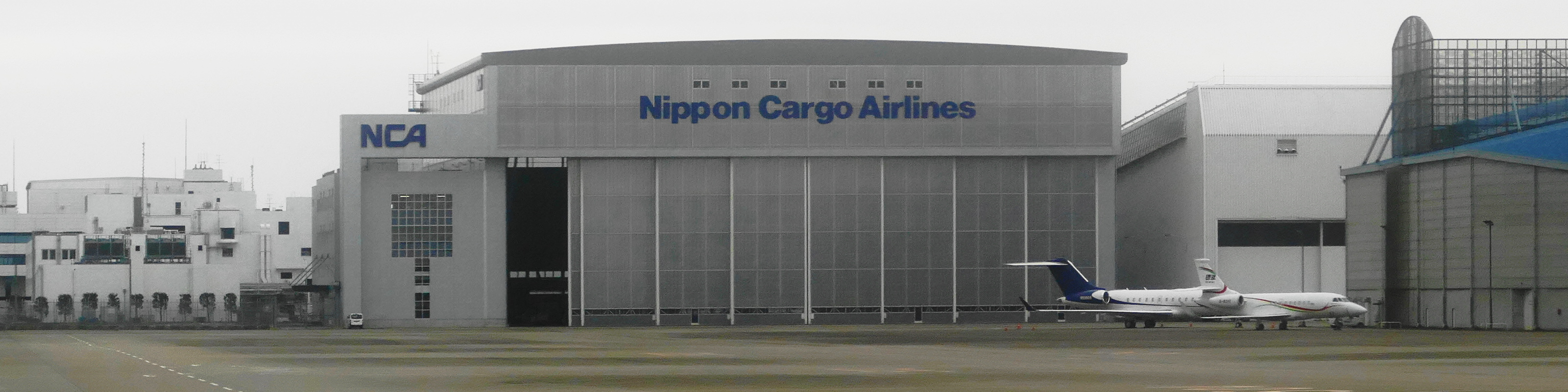
Nippon Cargo Airlines headquarters in Narita

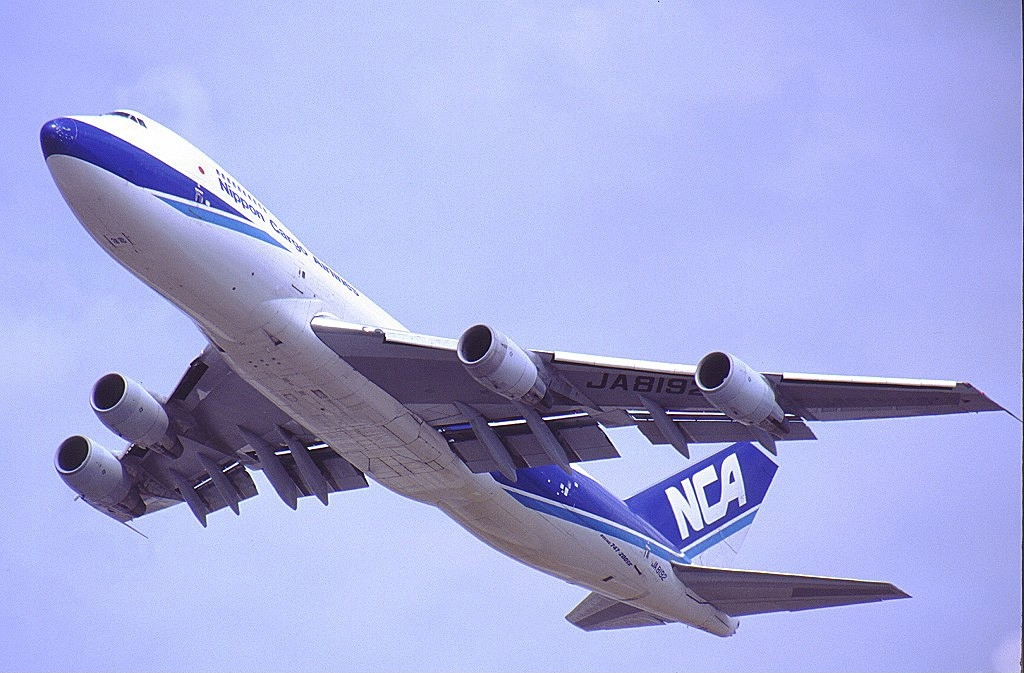
Nippon Cargo Airlines Boeing 747-200F , 2001

Nippon Cargo Airlines has its headquarters in the NCA Line Maintenance Hangar (NCAライン整備ハンガー NCA Rain Seibi Hangā) at Narita International Airport in Narita, Chiba Prefecture. The hangar is within the engineering and maintenance complex at Narita Airport. The facility has several environmentally friendly aspects, including a light wall, top lighting, naturally balanced wind power vent windows, a garden roof, a solar water heating system, and equipment to use rainwater to wash aircraft fuselages.

In 2007 NCA signed a deal with Nippon Steel Engineering, which historically built hangars for large aircraft, for the construction of a maintenance and engineering hangar at Narita. The building was to have environmentally friendly procedures conducive to maintaining aircraft during the daytime, because NCA has its aircraft maintenance activities scheduled for daytime hours. On April 30, 2009, the construction of the line maintenance hangar was completed. On June 8, 2009, the hangar's operations began.

In July 1978, when the company first began, it operated within a single room inside All Nippon Airways's space in the Kasumigaseki Building in Kasumigaseki, Chiyoda, Tokyo. In March 1997 NCA moved its headquarters from the Shiroyama JT Mori Building (城山JT森ビル Shiroyama JT Mori Biru) to the 10th floor of the New Kasumigaseki Building (新霞が関ビル Shin Kasumigaseki Biru), which had housed NCA's marketing division from 1987 to 1991. In March 2003, due to a demand for more space, the headquarters moved to the Shiodome City Center in Shiodome, Minato, Tokyo when it opened; the move was the fifth time the headquarters moved. The airline had its headquarters and its East Japan sales office on the 8th floor.

==== Regional office facilities ====
Currently the airline's corporate Tokyo office is in the Onarimon Yusen Building (御成門郵船ビルディング Onarimon Yūsen Biru) in Nishi-Shimbashi, Minato, Tokyo. In 2008 the corporate Narita office was on the fourth floor of the Cargo Administration Building (貨物管理ビル Kamotsu Kanri Biru).

==== Other Japan facilities ====
NCA opened a computer center in Koto, Tokyo in 2007, with the opening ceremony taking place on March 12, 2007. Previously the computer operations were done at the ANA computer center. On October 9, 2007, the airline established its Global Operations Center at Terminal 2 of Narita International Airport. Some members of the technical section of the flight operations headquarters were immediately moved to the new center. In the northern hemisphere spring of 2008, crew-related sections were to be transferred to the new operations center. In 2007 NCA signed an order with Taisei Corporation for the construction of a crew training center. Construction on the crew center, located in Shibayama, Sanbu District, was to begin in September 2007. The company scheduled for the facility to become operational in September 2008. On May 6, 2011, the airline announced that it was relocating its local Narita offices and its cargo warehouse from Narita's north cargo area to Narita's south cargo area.

=== Divisions and worldwide offices ===
In 2007, NCA established the regional subsidiaries NCA Americas Inc. and Nippon Cargo Airlines Europe B.V. Its Americas regional headquarters is on the property of O'Hare International Airport in Chicago, Illinois. Originally the US subsidiary was to be headquartered in New York. Its European regional headquarters is on the property of Amsterdam Airport Schiphol in Haarlemmermeer, Netherlands.

== Destinations ==
Nippon Cargo Airlines serves the following destinations (as of June 2024):

Country	City	Airport	Notes	Refs
Azerbaijan	Baku	Heydar Aliyev International Airport		
China	Shanghai	Shanghai Pudong International Airport		
Germany	Frankfurt	Frankfurt Airport		
Hong Kong	Hong Kong	Hong Kong International Airport		
Italy	Milan	Milan Malpensa Airport		
Japan	Kitakyushu	Kitakyushu Airport		
Japan	Nagoya	Chubu Centrair International Airport		
Japan	Okinawa	Naha Airport	Hub	
Japan	Osaka	Kansai International Airport	Hub	
Japan	Tokyo	Narita International Airport	Hub	
Netherlands	Amsterdam	Amsterdam Airport Schiphol		
Singapore	Singapore	Changi Airport		
Taiwan	Taipei	Taoyuan International Airport		
Thailand	Bangkok	Suvarnabhumi Airport		
United States	Anchorage	Ted Stevens Anchorage International Airport		
United States	Chicago	Chicago O'Hare International Airport		
United States	Dallas	Dallas Fort Worth International Airport		
United States	Los Angeles	Los Angeles International Airport		
United States	New York City	John F. Kennedy International Airport		
United States	San Francisco	San Francisco International Airport		

=== Codeshare agreements ===
Nippon Cargo Airlines codeshares with the following airlines:

- All Nippon Airways
- Cargolux
- Mas Air
- Singapore Airlines Cargo

== Fleet ==
=== Current fleet ===
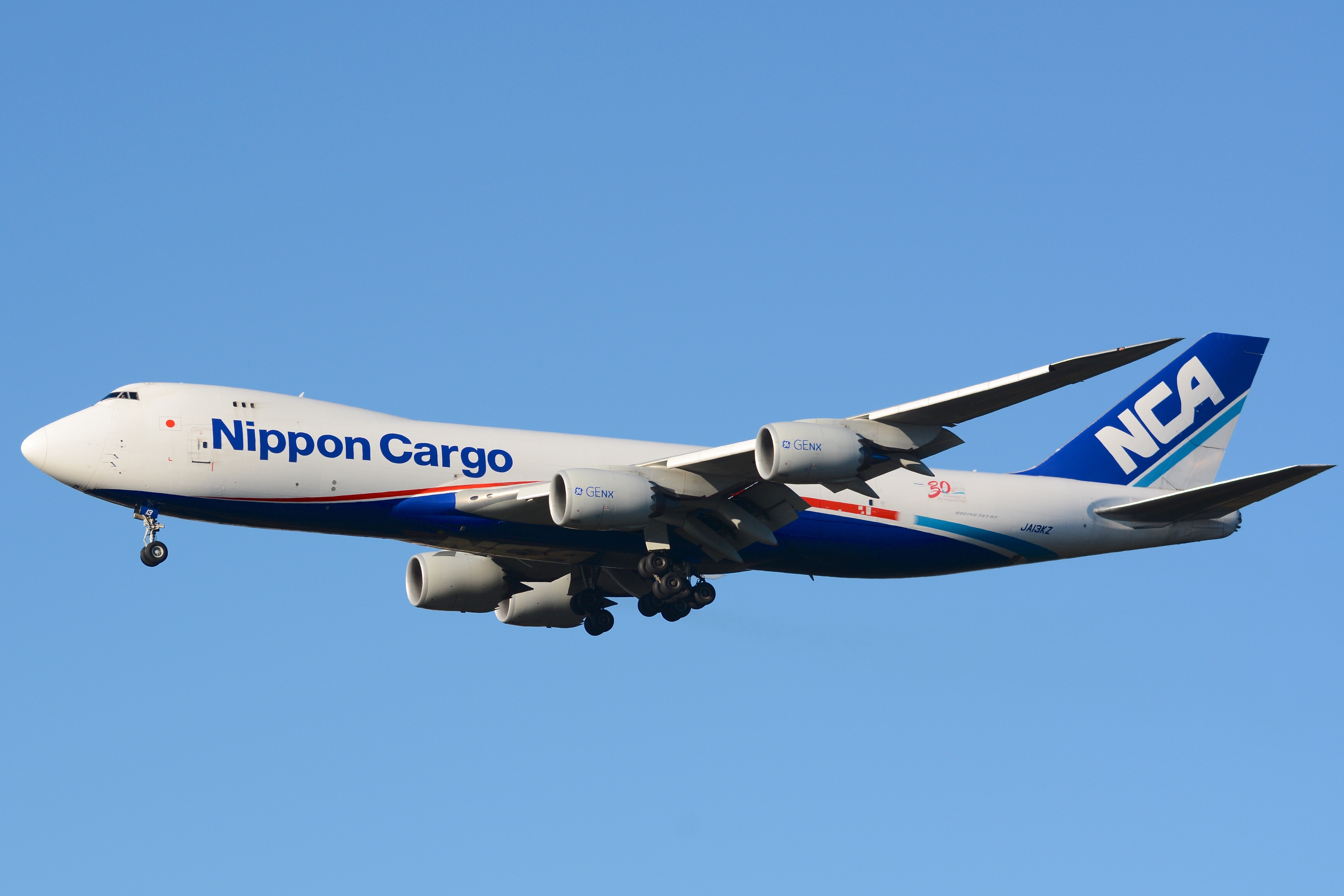
Nippon Cargo Airlines Boeing 747-8F in 2015

As of July 2026, Nippon Cargo Airlines operates the following aircraft:

Nippon Cargo Airlines fleet
Aircraft	In fleet	Order	Notes
Boeing 747-8F	8	—	
Total	8	—	

=== Fleet development ===
- On 9 June 2005 Nippon Cargo Airline's first Boeing 747-400F was delivered in Everett, Washington, the first of four ordered by the airline.
- In June 2006, NCA ordered two additional Boeing 747-400F to eight that had already been ordered. These aircraft were delivered beginning in 2008 and replaced the Boeing 747-200F. By May 2009, the ten 747-400 had been delivered, but the last two were placed with Cargo B Airlines, a Belgian operator which NCA owned shares of. Cargo B filed for bankruptcy in May 2009, and the two aircraft were placed into storage. Subsequently, both were leased (or possibly sold) to AirBridgeCargo Airlines.
- In 2007 the airline had ordered 14 Boeing 747-8 freighter aircraft and has taken delivery of eight examples. In 2015 it cancelled outstanding orders for four of the aircraft, but still retains options on two more. It is thought to be due to the downturn of cargo volumes in the Asia Pacific region. In 2017, it cancelled the remaining two options of the aircraft, leaving the airline with no further unfulfilled aircraft orders.

=== Former fleet ===
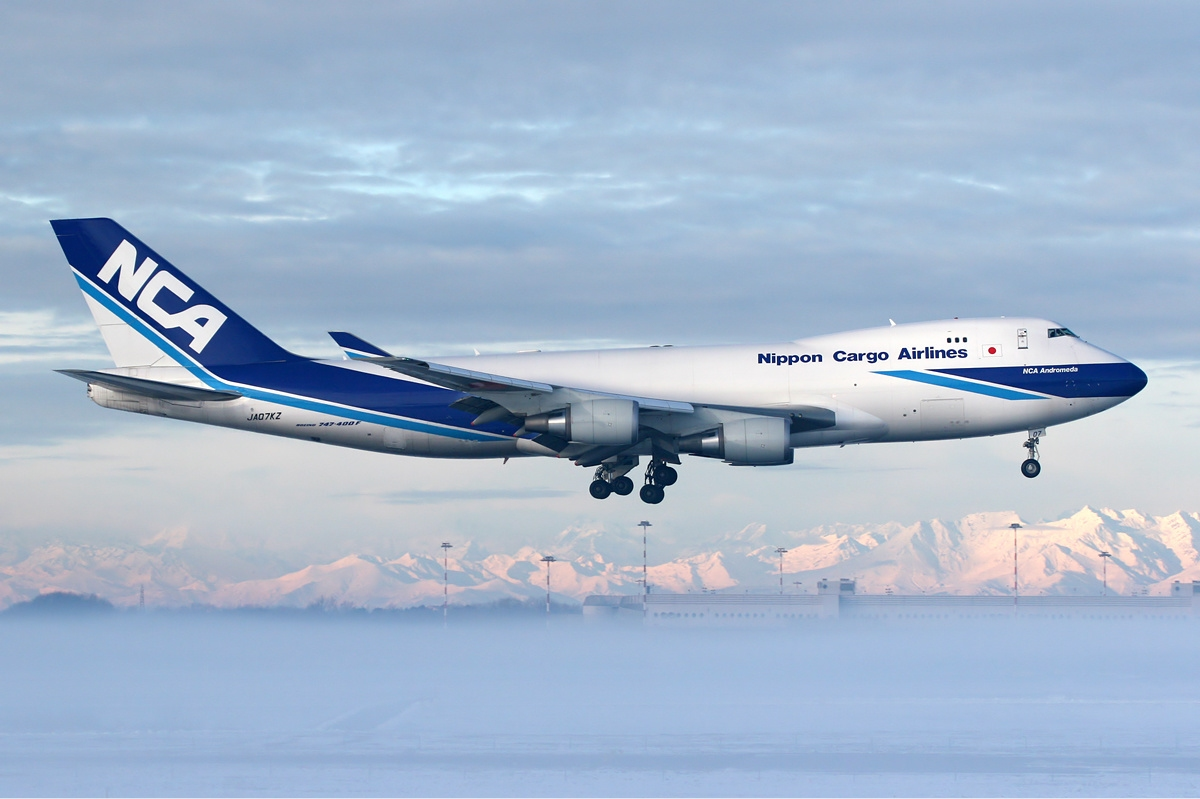
Nippon Cargo Airlines Boeing 747-400F, 2008

As of August 2025, Nippon Cargo Airlines operated 8 Boeing 747-8F.

Nippon Cargo Airlines previously operated the following aircraft:

Nippon Cargo Airlines former fleet
Aircraft	Total	Introduced	Retired	Notes
Boeing 747-200F	6	1984	2011	
Boeing 747-200SF	4	1997	2008	
Boeing 747SR-81F	1	1993	2009	
Boeing 747-400F	10	2005	2019	
