= Ministry of Internal Affairs and Communications =

Government ministry of Japan

- 総務省; Sōmu-shō

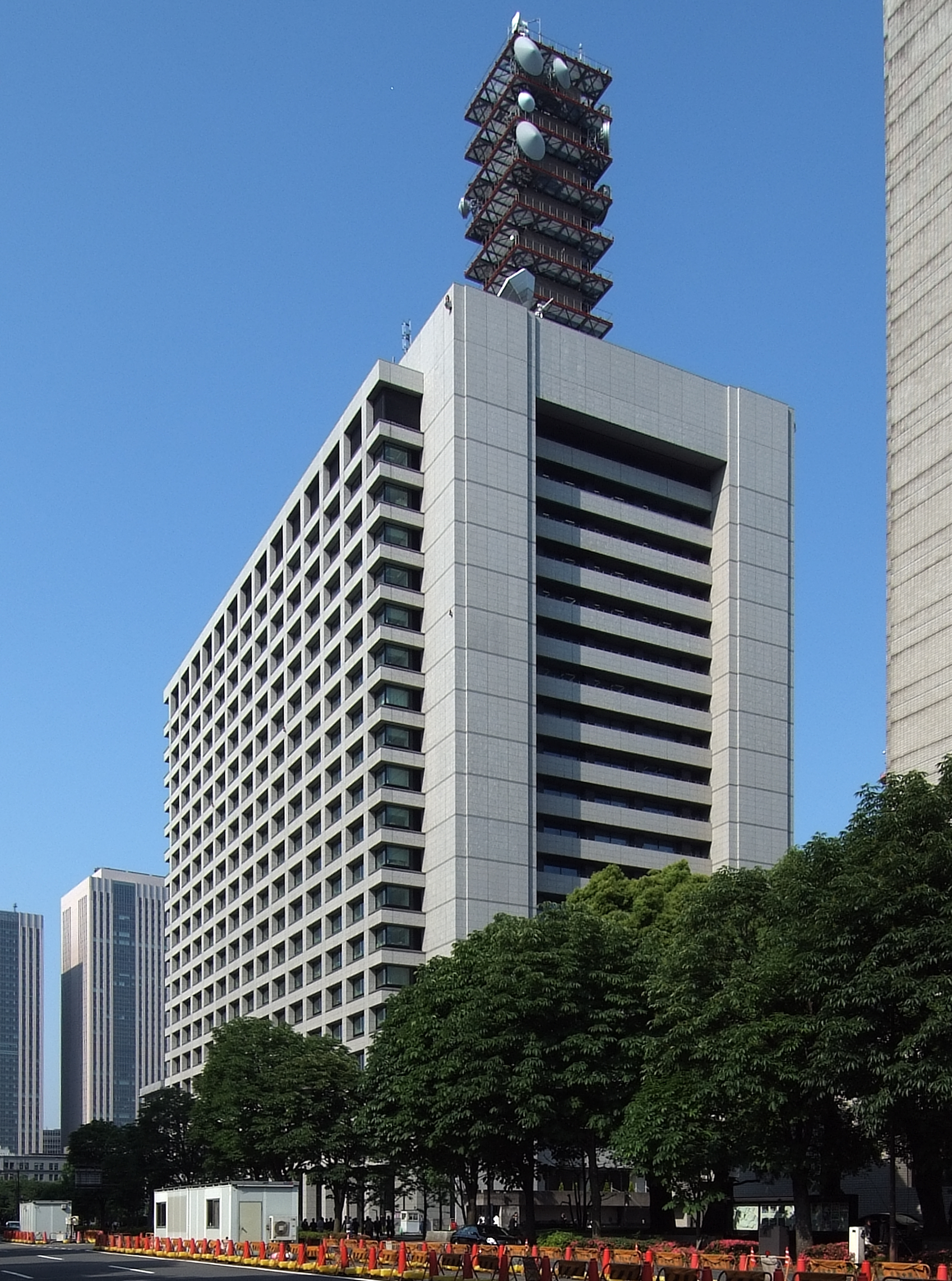
- 2nd Building of the Central Common Government Office, the building which houses the ministry

Agency overview
- Formed: January 6, 2001
- Preceding agencies: Ministry of Home Affairs; Ministry of Posts and Telecommunications; Management and Coordination Agency
- Jurisdiction: Government of Japan
- Headquarters: 2-1-2 Kasumigaseki, Chiyoda-ku, Tokyo, Japan; 35°40′31.32″N 139°45′40.03″E
- Employees: 5245
- Ministers responsible: Hisayuki Fujii, Minister for Internal Affairs and Communications; Noriko Horiuchi, State Minister for Internal Affairs and Communications; Katsunori Takahashi, State Minister for Internal Affairs and Communications; Hideyuki Nakano, Parliamentary Vice-Minister for Internal Affairs and Communications; Daisuke Kajihara, Parliamentary Vice-Minister for Internal Affairs and Communications; Jun Mukoyama, Parliamentary Vice-Minister for Internal Affairs and Communications
- Website: www.soumu.go.jp/english/index.html

The Ministry of Internal Affairs and Communications (総務省, Sōmu-shō; lit. 'Ministry of General Affairs'; MIC) is a cabinet-level ministry in the Government of Japan. Its English name was Ministry of Public Management, Home Affairs, Posts and Telecommunications (MPHPT) prior to 2004. It is housed in the 2nd Building of the Central Common Government Office at 2-1-2 Kasumigaseki in Chiyoda, Tokyo, Japan.

The Ministry oversees the Japanese administrative system, manages local governments, elections, telecommunication, post, and governmental statistics.

The Minister for Internal Affairs and Communications (総務大臣, Sōmu Daijin) is appointed from among the members of the cabinet.

== History ==
The Ministry was created on January 6, 2001, by the merger of the Ministry of Home Affairs (自治省), the Ministry of Posts and Telecommunications (郵政省; MPT) and the Management and Coordination Agency (総務庁). Certain functions of the Management and Coordination Agency were transferred to the Cabinet Office in this process, while many functions of the MPT were transferred to an independent Postal Services Agency which later became Japan Post.

== Subdivisions ==
The Ministry has the following subdivisions as of July 2011:

=== Bureaus ===
- Minister's Secretariat (大臣官房)
  - Director-General of Minister's Secretariat
  - Director-General for Policy Coordination (3)
  - Director-General for Regional Vitalization
  - Director-General for Policy Evaluation
  - Deputy Director-General of Minister's Secretariat (14)
  - Counselor (12)
  - Secretarial Division
  - General Affairs Division
  - Accounts Division
  - Policy Planning Division
  - Policy Evaluation and Public Relations Division
  - Management Office
- Personnel and Pension Bureau (人事恩給局)
  - Director-General of the Personnel and Pension Bureau
  - Deputy Director-General of Personnel and Pension Bureau
  - General Affairs Division
  - Personnel Policy Division
  - Aged Personnel Policy Division
  - Pension Planning Division
  - Pension Examination Division
  - Pension Execution Division
  - Counselor (5)
- Administrative Management Bureau (行政管理局)
  - Director-General of the Administrative Management Bureau
  - Planning and Coordination Division
  - Government Information Systems Planning Division
  - Director for Management (8)
- Administrative Evaluation Bureau (行政評価局)
  - Director-General of the Administrative Evaluation Bureau
  - General Affairs Division
  - Administrative Counseling Division
  - Director for Policy Evaluation
  - Director for Evaluation and Inspection (9)
- Local Administration Bureau (自治行政局)
  - Director-General of the Local Administration Bureau
  - Local Administration Division
  - Administration Improvement Division
  - Municipal Merger Promotion Division
  - Regional Policy Division
  - Regional Self-support Promotion Division
  - Local Public Service Personnel Department
  - Director-General of the Local Public Service Personnel Department
  - Local Public Service Personnel Division
  - Welfare Division
  - Election Department
  - Director-General of the Election Department
  - Election Division
  - Election Management Division
  - Political Funds Regulation Division
- Local Public Finance Bureau (自治財政局)
  - Director-General of the Local Public Finance Bureau
  - Local Public Finance Division
  - Local Public Finance Coordination Division
  - Local Allocation Tax Division
  - Local Bond Division
  - Local Public Enterprise Division
  - Financial Management Division
- Local Tax Bureau (自治税務局)
  - Director-General of the Local Tax Bureau
  - Local Tax Planning Division
  - Prefectural Tax Policy Division
  - Municipal Tax Planning Division
  - Fixed Property Tax Division
- Global Strategy Bureau (国際戦略局)
  - Director-General of the Global Strategy Bureau
  - International Strategy Division
  - Technology Policy Division
  - Standardization Division
  - Space Communications Policy Division
  - International Deployment Division
  - International Economic Affairs Division
  - International Cooperation Division
  - Counselor
- Information and Communications Bureau (情報流通行政局)
  - Director-General of the Information and Communications Bureau
  - General Affairs Division
  - Information and Communications Policy Division
  - Promotion for Content Distribution Division
  - ICT Accessibility and Human Resources Development Division
  - Regional Communications Development Division
  - Broadcasting Policy Division
  - Broadcasting Technology Division
  - Terrestrial Broadcasting Division
  - Satellite and International Broadcasting Division
  - Regional Broadcasting Division
  - Postal Services Policy Planning Department
  - Director-General of the Postal Services Policy Planning Department
  - Planning Division
  - Postal Policy Division
  - Post Office Utilization Division
- Telecommunications Bureau (総合通信基盤局)
  - Director-General of the Telecommunications Bureau
  - General Affairs Division
  - Telecommunications Business Department
  - Director-General of the Telecommunications Business Department
  - Telecommunications Policy Division
  - Tariff and Telecommunications Access Policy Division
  - Computer Communications Division
  - Telecommunication Systems Division
  - Advanced Network Division
  - Telecommunications Consumer Policy Division
  - Radio Department
  - Director-General of the Radio Department
  - Radio Policy Division
  - Fixed Radio Communications Division
  - Land Mobile Communications Division
  - Mobile Satellite Communications Division
  - Electromagnetic Environment Division
- Statistics Bureau (統計局)
  - Director-General of Statistics Bureau
  - General Affairs Division
  - Statistical Information Systems Division
  - Statistical Standards Department
  - Director-General of the Statistical Survey Department
  - Statistical Planning Division
  - International Statistical Affairs Division
  - Director for Statistical Clearance (3)
  - Statistical Survey Department
  - Director General of Department
  - Survey Planning Division
  - Population Census Division
  - Economic Statistics Division
  - Economic Structure Statistics Division
  - Consumer Statistics Division
  - Director General for Policy Planning
  - Director for Statistical Planning
  - Director for Statistical Clearance (3)
  - Director for International Statistical Affairs
- Director-General for Cybersecurity

=== Institutes and colleges ===
- Local Autonomy College (自治大学校)
- Institute for Information and Communications Policy (情報通信政策研究所)
- Statistical Research and Training Institute (統計研修所)
- Fire and Dispute Management College (消防大学校)

=== Special organizations ===
- Central Election Management Council (中央選挙管理会)
- National Committee for the Management of Political Funds (政治資金適正化委員会)
- Commissioner for Local Dispute Management (自治紛争処理委員) (Committee for Settling National-Local Disputes)
- MIC Digital Television Call Center (総務省 地デジコールセンター) (closed 2016)

=== External agencies ===
- Environmental Dispute Coordination Commission (公害等調整委員会)
- Fire and Disaster Management Agency (消防庁)

== See also ==
- Home Ministry (Japan)
- List of telecommunications regulatory bodies
