= Tokuyama Corporation =

Japanese chemical company

- Native name: 株式会社トクヤマ
- Company type: Public (K.K)
- Traded as: TYO: 4043; Nikkei 225 Component
- Industry: Chemicals
- Founded: Tokuyama, Yamaguchi (February 16, 1918; 108 years ago)
- Founder: Katsujiro Iwai
- Headquarters: Kasumigaseki Common Gate West Tower, 2-1, Kasumigaseki 3-chome, Chiyoda-ku, Tokyo 100-8983, Japan
- Key people: Kazuhisa Kogo (President)
- Products: Basic chemicals; Electronic materials; IC chemicals; Fine chemicals; Cement
- Services: Recycling
- Revenue: ▲US$ 2.78 billion (FY 2013) (JPY 287.33 billion) (FY 2013)
- Net income: ▲US$ 99.20 million (FY 2013) (JPY 10.21 billion) (FY 2013)
- Number of employees: 5,756 (consolidated, as of March 31, 2014)
- Website: Official website

Tokuyama Corporation (株式会社トクヤマ, Kabushiki-gaisha Tokuyama) is a Japanese, Tokyo-based chemical company and the world's fourth largest silicon manufacturer.

The company was founded as Nihon Soda Kogyo Co., Ltd., a producer of soda ash in 1918 by Katsujiro Iwai. It changed name in 1936 to Tokuyama Soda Co., Ltd. and in 1994 to its present name. It is listed on the Tokyo Stock Exchange and is a component of the Nikkei 225 stock index.

The company operates across Japan, Taiwan, China, South Korea, Singapore, Malaysia, Australia, United States, and Germany.

== Business segments and products ==
=== Chemicals business ===
- Soda ash and calcium chloride
- Chlor-alkali and vinyl chloride products: caustic soda (liquid, flake), propylene oxide, vinyl chloride monomer
- New organic chemicals: isopropyl alcohol

=== Cement business ===
- Portland cement: ordinary, early-strength, medium-heat
- Recycling services
- Fresco Giclee

=== Specialty products business ===
- Electronic materials: polycrystalline silicon
- Fumed silica
- SHAPAL products: aluminum nitride (powder, granules)
- IC chemicals and the cleaning system: high purity chemicals for electronics manufacturing, positive-type photoresist

=== Life and amenity business ===
- Fine Chemicals: photochromic dye materials, hard coating solutions for plastic lenses, pharmaceutical bulk ingredients, amino radical protectants
- Microporous film: polyethylene porous film
- Dental materials

== Gallery ==
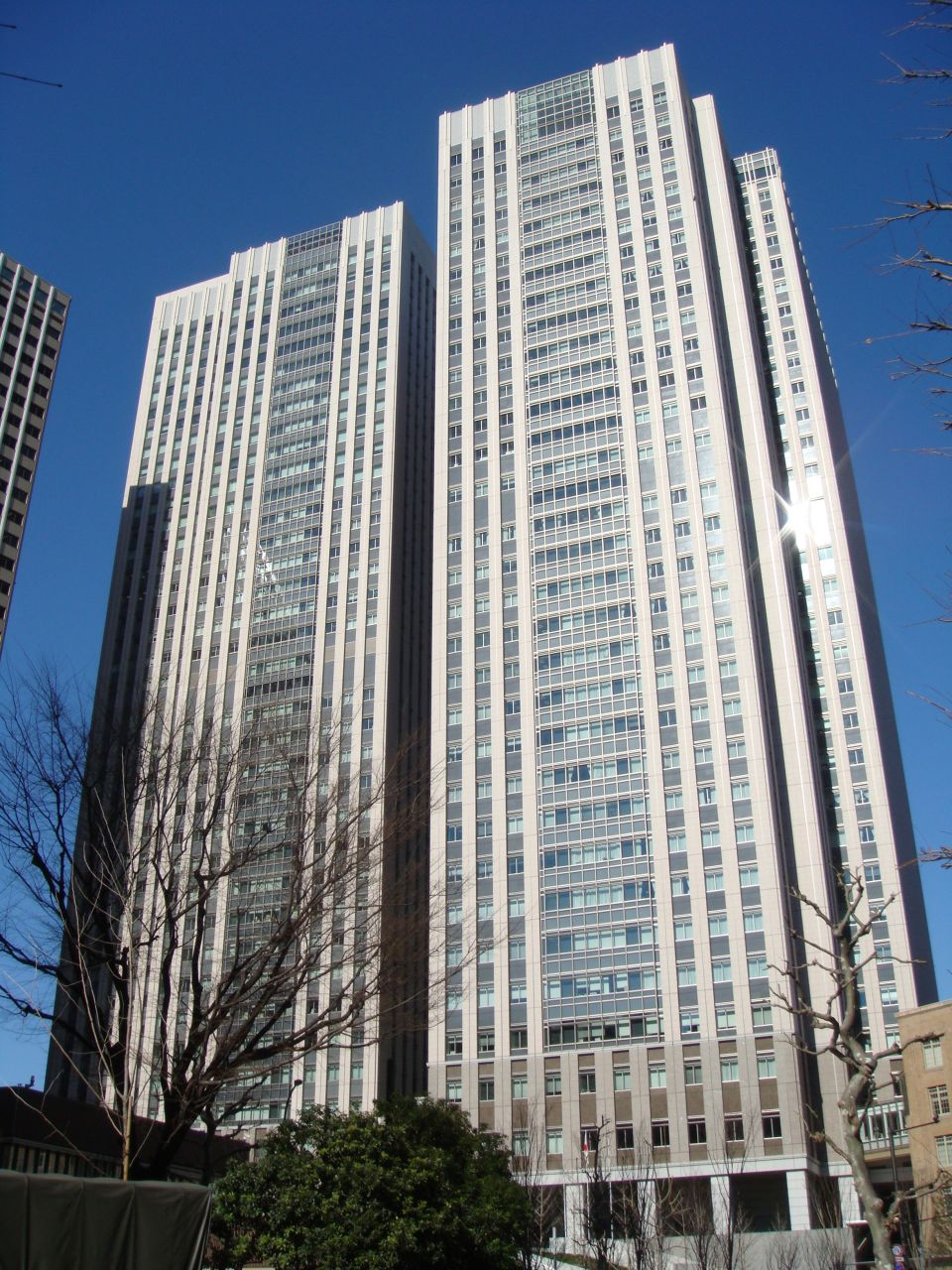
The headquarters of the company (left hand-side building)

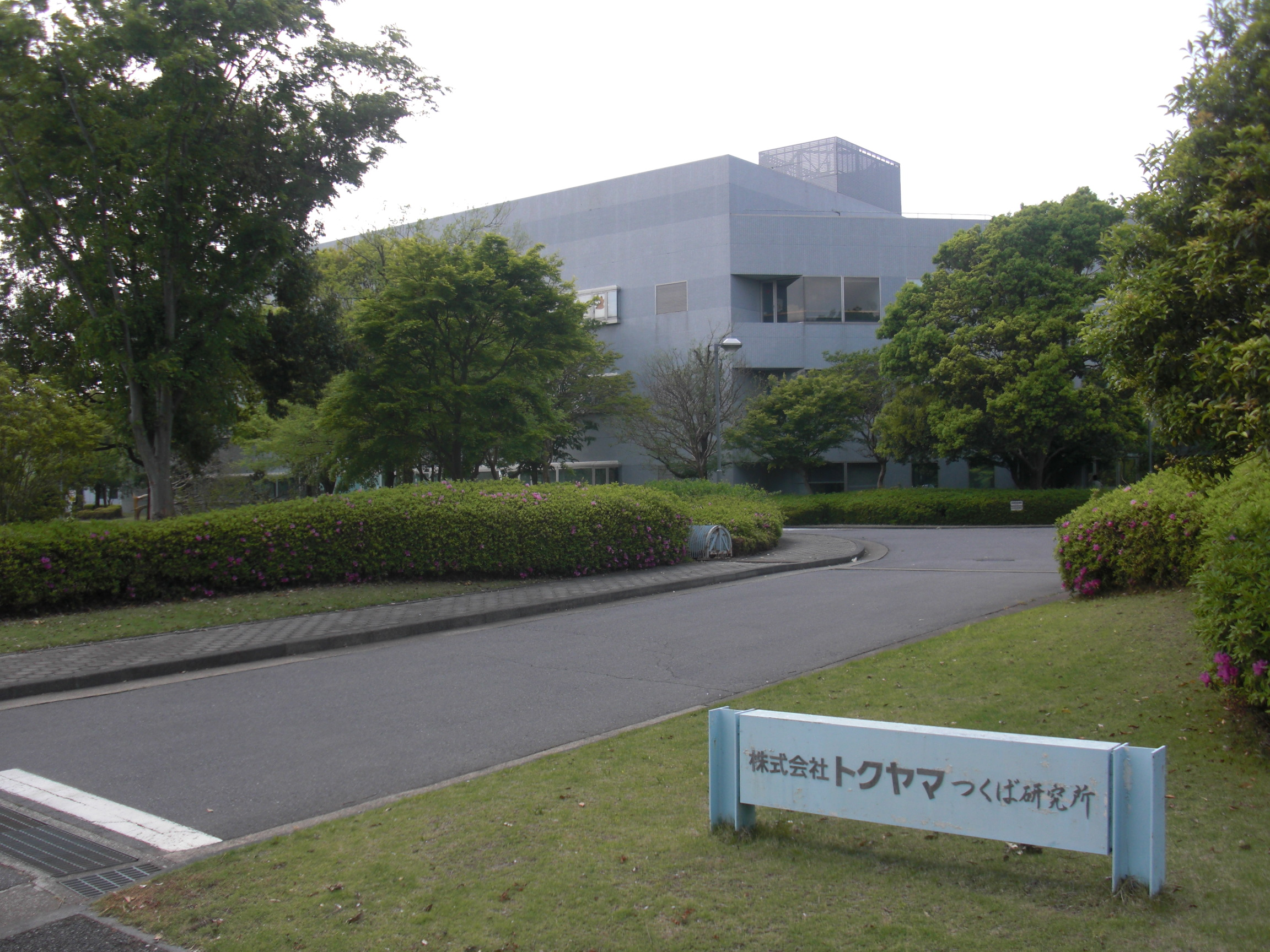
The company's research facility in Tsukuba, Ibaraki

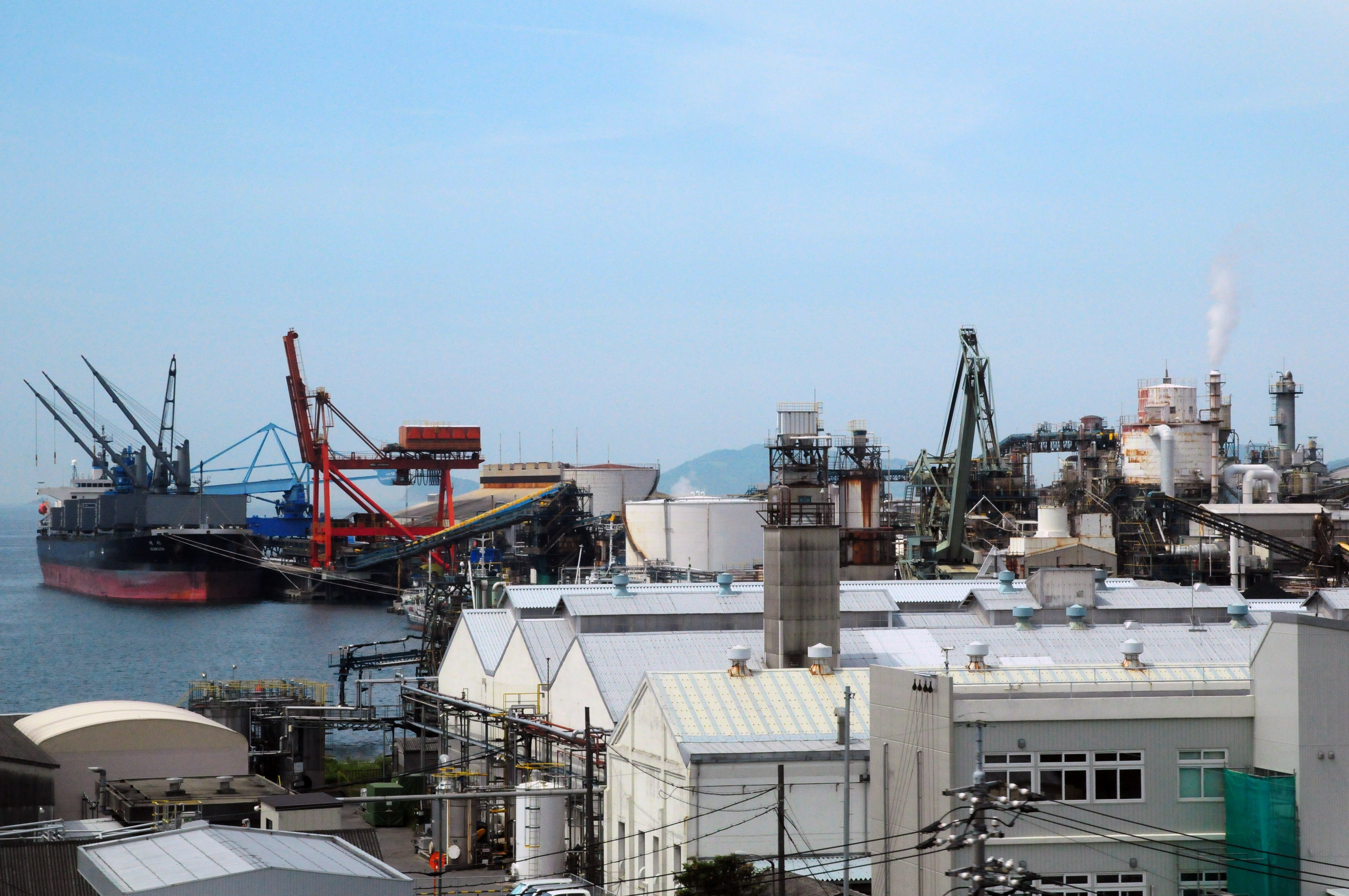
Chemical plant in Shūnan seen from the Sanyō Shinkansen

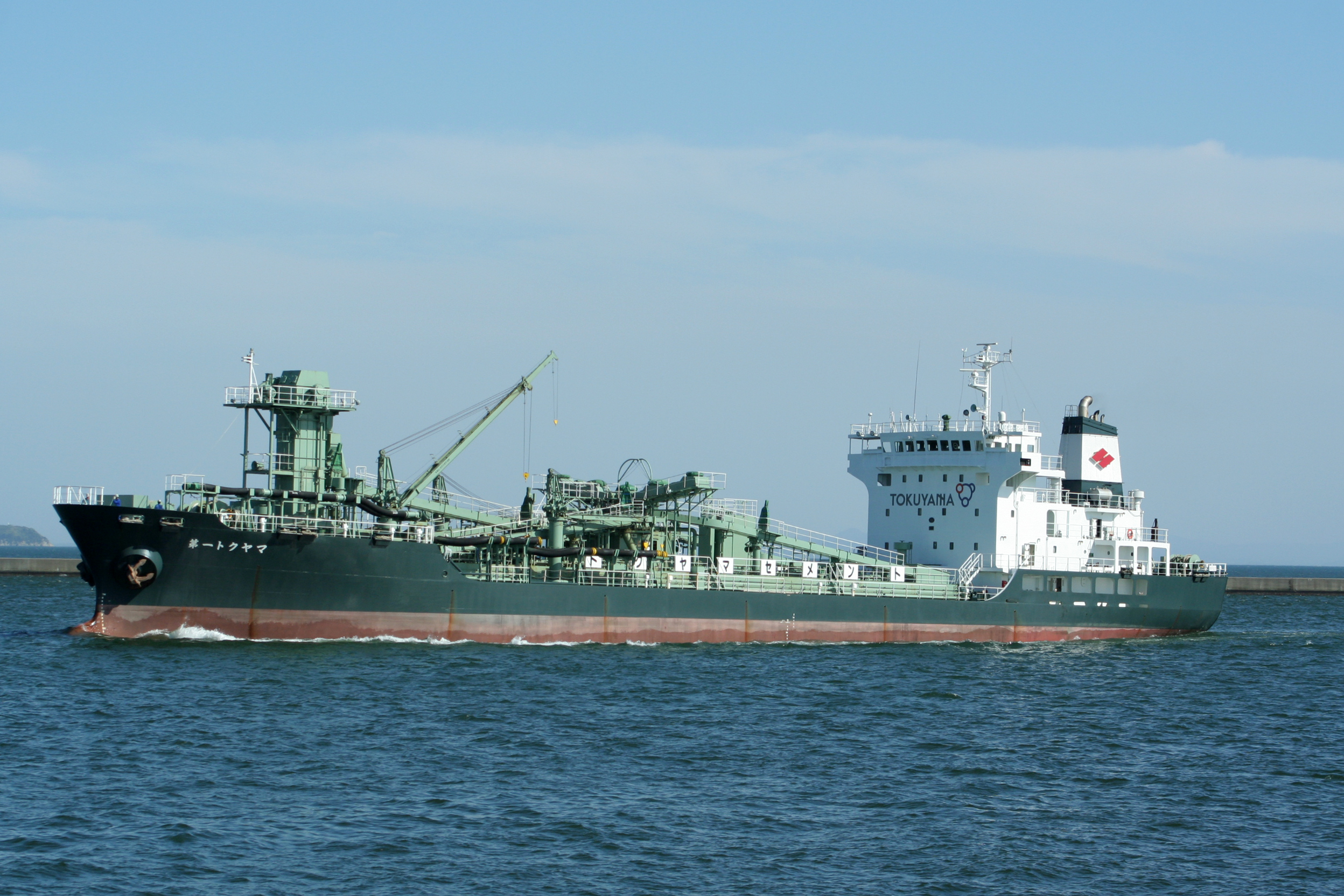
A Tokuyama cement ship
