= National Personnel Authority =

Japanese Government agency responsible for the civil service

- 人事院; Jinji-in

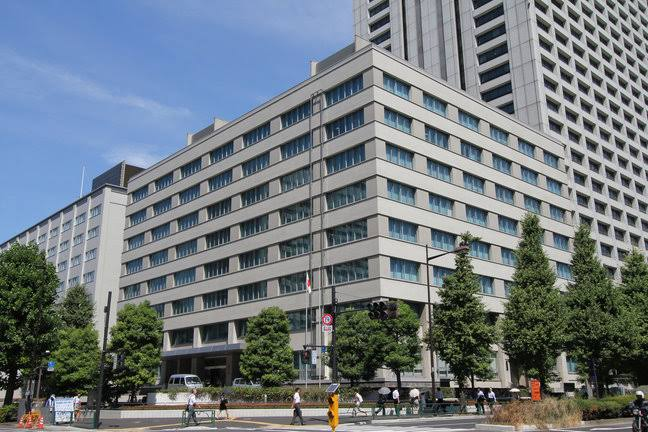
- Central Joint Government Building No. 5 Annex, which houses the National Personnel Authority.

Agency overview
- Formed: December 3, 1948
- Jurisdiction: Japan
- Headquarters: 1-2-3, Kasumigaseki, Chiyoda-ku, Tokyo, Japan
- Employees: 617
- Annual budget: \8,680,486,000 (2023)
- Agency executives: Yuko Kawamoto, President; Hiroaki Furuya, Commissioner; Katsura Ito, Commissioner; Sumiya Shibasaki, Secretary General
- Parent agency: Cabinet of Japan
- Website: jinji.go.jp/en/ (in English)

The National Personnel Authority (人事院, Jinji-in), also abbreviated NPA, is a Japanese administrative agency. In order to ensure fairness, neutrality and uniformity in the personnel management of national civil servants and fulfill the function of compensating for restrictions on basic labor rights, it is an administrative committee that enacts, amends and abolishes rules of the National Personnel Authority, judges adverse disposition reviews, and makes recommendations regarding salaries.

It is a "Central Personnel Administration Agency" established through the National Public Service Act. In order to maintain the fairness of personnel administration, although the National Personnel Authority itself belongs to the Cabinet, its authority is exercised independently of the Cabinet.

== Overview ==
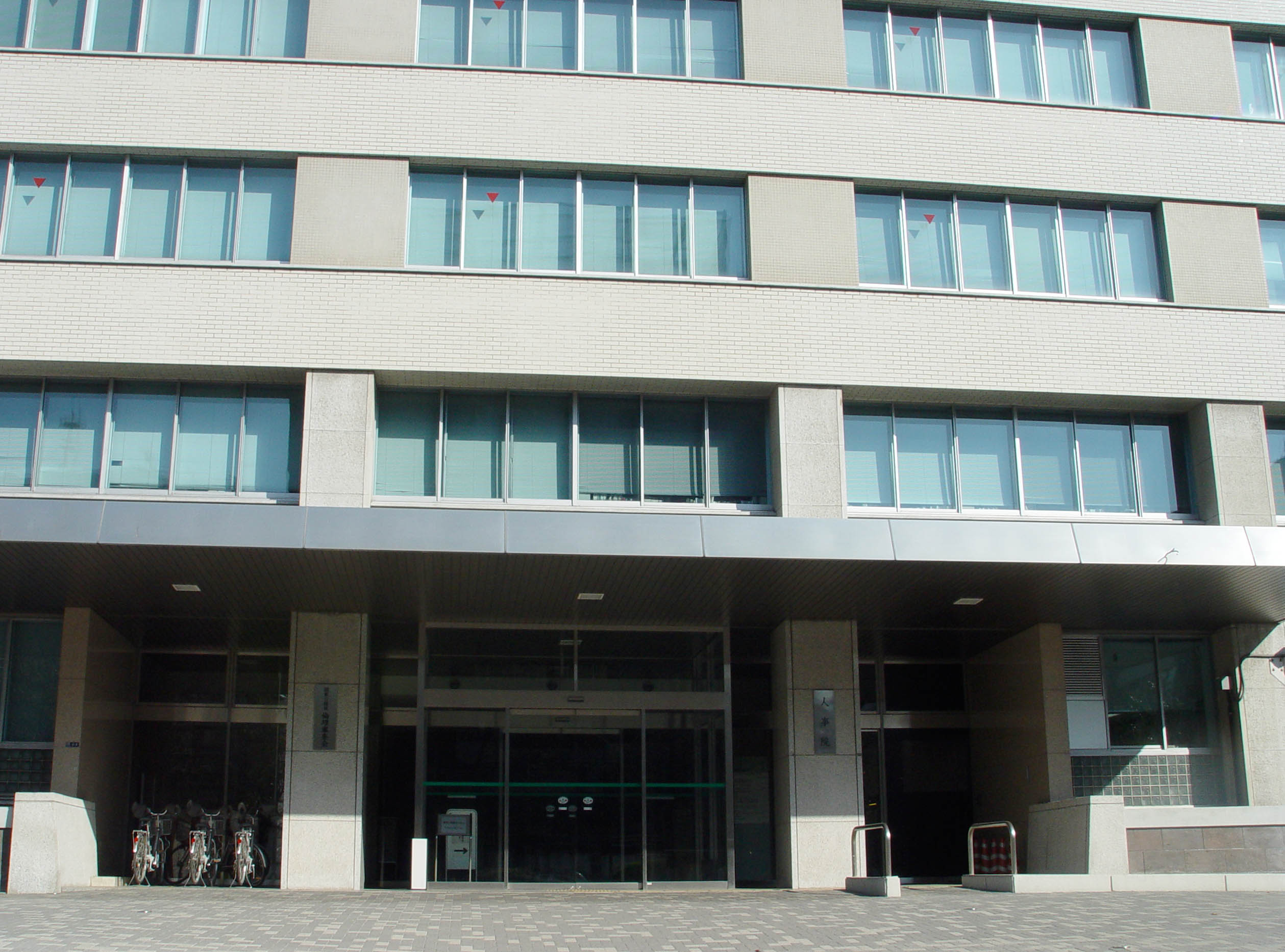
Public office building housing the National Personnel Authority

The National Personnel Authority is one of the central personnel administration agencies stipulated in the National Public Service Act. The central personnel administrative agency is an organization that sets standards for the personnel management of national civil servants who belong to general positions, and comprehensively coordinates personnel management performed by appointees of each ministry and agency. has a prime minister. The National Personnel Authority and the Prime Minister have different jurisdictions, and the National Personnel Authority occupies a position as the central body for the operation of the National Public Service Act.

Recommendations for improvement of salaries and other working conditions and personnel administration (recommendations by the National Personnel Authority), employment examinations, appointments, job titles, training, salaries, disciplinary actions, handling of complaints, maintenance of work ethics, and other personnel administration fairness regarding employees. Among these powers are quasi-legislative powers such as the power to enact regulations of the National Personnel Authority, quasi-judicial powers such as the right to make judgments on requests for administrative measures and requests for review of adverse dispositions, powers to recommend salaries, and investigations into personnel administration. It includes important rights such as rights. In the past, it was supposed to be in charge of affairs related to the job class system, but since the job class system itself was abolished due to the revision of the National Public Service Act in the 166th session of the Diet (2007), the office work related to the job class system was also abolished.

Personnel management in the modern civil service system must be thoroughly merit-based and performance-based (qualification appointment system), eliminating all biases based on political parties and other factors, in order to ensure the continuity and expertise of administration. In addition, since modern administration has become extremely complicated and specialized, it is necessary to secure specialization and uniformity through personnel management technology based on scientific research. In addition, civil servants' basic labor rights are restricted, and as a compensation, a third-party organization independent of the employer, the government, must protect the interests of the employees.

In order to meet these demands, the National Personnel Authority is given strong authority and independence as a kind of so-called administrative committee. Furthermore, while other administrative committees such as the Fair Trade Commission and the Central Labour Commission belong to the Cabinet Office and ministries as “external bureaus”, The House is directly "under the jurisdiction of the Cabinet". In other words, the National Public Service Act under the jurisdiction of the National Personnel Authority is the establishment law of the National Personnel Authority, and the National Administrative Organisation Act does not apply. Although its independence and authority do not reach those of the courts and the Board of Audit, which are institutions based on the Constitution (the abolition of these, the reduction of the authority directly granted by the Constitution, and the delegation to other institutions, etc.) The National Personnel Authority itself must be revised, but since the National Personnel Authority is an institution created by law, such a problem does not arise), and it is extremely strong among administrative organs under the Cabinet.

== Organisation ==
The National Personnel Authority is a collegial executive body composed of three personnel officers. Personnel officers are appointed by the Cabinet with the consent of both houses of the Diet, one of whom is appointed as President of the National Personnel Authority to represent the National Personnel Authority. Decisions of the National Personnel Authority are made at the National Personnel Authority meeting held at least once a week. Under the National Personnel Authority, there is the General Secretariat, which is a clerical department, and the National Personnel Authority appoints officials below the Secretary General within the budget. In addition, the National Public Service Ethics Board has been established based on the National Public Service Law and the National Public Service Ethics Act.

The National Personnel Authority shall manage its own internal organization, and the National Administrative Organization Law and the Law Concerning the Number of Employees of Administrative Organs (Total Personnel Act) shall not apply. Therefore, the National Personnel Authority can determine the organization and number of personnel of the General Secretariat independently by rules of the National Personnel Authority without being subject to regulations by the Cabinet Personnel Bureau.

Departments / Bureaus	Description
Secretariat Divisions	The Divisions are responsible for internal management duties, international cooperation on public management, coordination on NPA policies.
Employment Welfare Bureau	The Bureau is responsible for matters regarding working hours and leave systems, development and promotion for measures to support child and nursing care, employee health, safety and accident compensation.
Human Resources Bureau	The Bureau is responsible for matters regarding securing and developing human resources and recruitment.
Remuneration Bureau	The Bureau engages in duties related to the remuneration system of national public employees.
Equity and Investigation Bureau	The Bureau engages in quasi-judicial duties, such as conducting hearings and other necessary investigations and issuing judgments, when a national public employee files an objection or a claim to administrative measures to the NPA based on rules and regulations.
