= Kenichiro Komai =

Japanese businessman (1900–1986)

- 駒井 健一郎
- Born: December 17, 1900; Tokyo, Japan
- Died: October 2, 1986 (aged 85)
- Education: University of Tokyo
- Occupation: Business executive
- Known for: 3rd president of Hitachi

Kenichiro Komai (駒井 健一郎, Komai Ken'ichirō; December 17, 1900 – October 2, 1986) was a Japanese business executive, who served as the third president of Hitachi from 1961 to 1971.

== Career ==
Komai joined Hitachi in 1923, becoming a factory manager by 1945 during World War II.

Succeeding Chikara Kurata as president in 1961, Komai worked to strengthen the corporation's financial systems and investments in overseas markets, leading Hitachi through the “3Cs Boom” of cars, color television, and coolers (air conditioning). During his tenure, Hitachi held rapid growth and helped produce numerous records, building the world's first Shinkansen train to top 200 km/h, as well as the Kasumigaseki Building's elevators, which were the fastest in Japan at the time. He was considered one of the country's leading experts on nuclear energy.

Komai was one of few Japanese members of the Club of Rome think tank, whose 1972 report, The Limits to Growth, inspired him to create the Hitachi Research Institute in 1973 after stepping down as president. This was during the wake of major restructuring in the company, following the Nixon shock and subsequent OAPEC oil crisis. After resigning, Komai was succeeded by Hirokichi Yoshiyama.
