= Old Ministry of Justice Building =

- 法務省旧本館
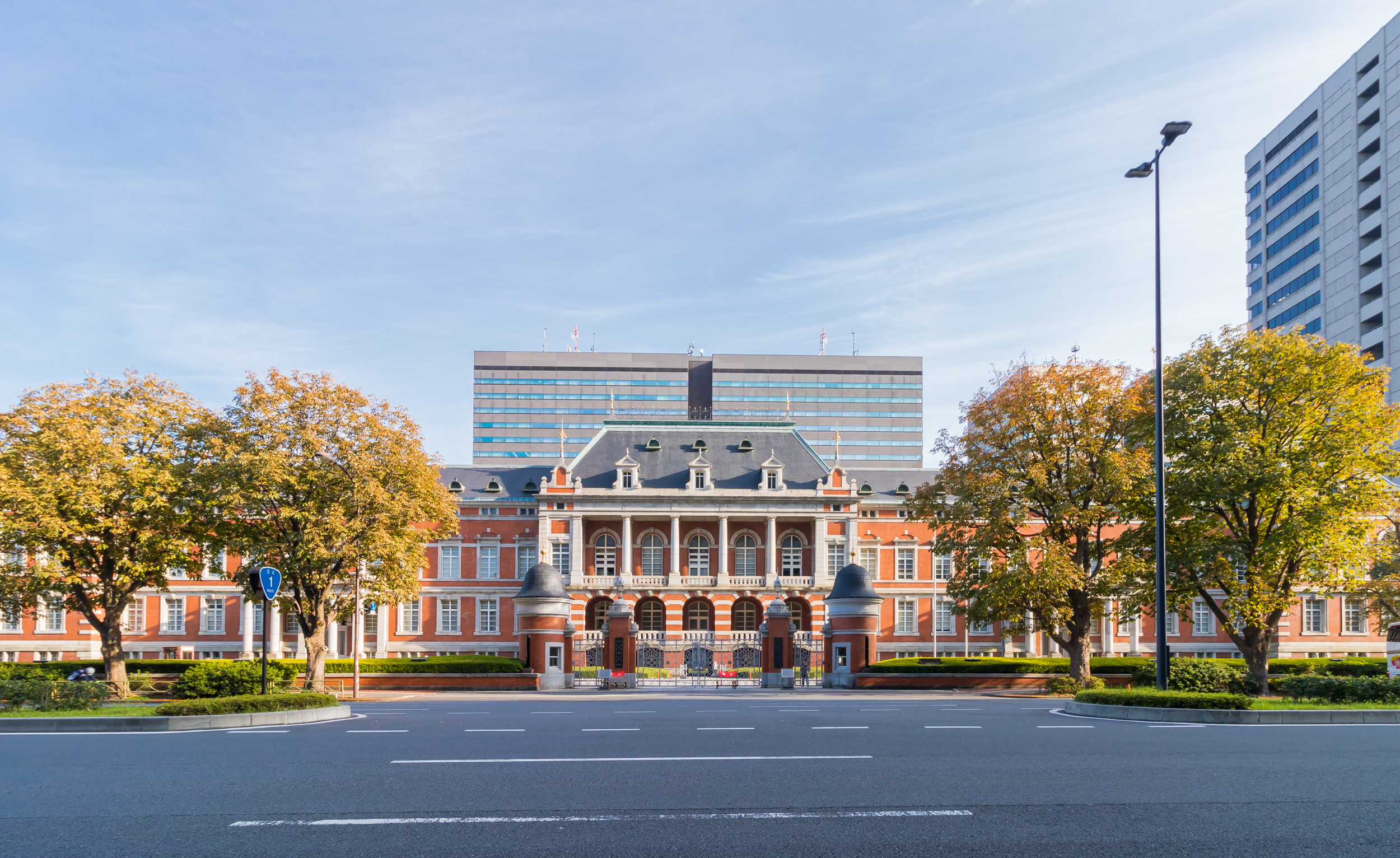
- Alternative names: Red-Brick Building; Central Government Office Complex No. 6

General information
- Address: 1-1-1 Kasumigaseki, Chiyoda, Tokyo
- Country: Japan
- Coordinates: 35°40′35.2″N 139°45′12.4″E
- Current tenants: Ministry of Justice
- Completed: 1895

The Old Ministry of Justice Building (法務省旧本館), also known as the Red-Brick Building (赤れんが棟), is an historical building in the Kasumigaseki district of Chiyoda, Tokyo, Japan. It previously served as the headquarters of the Ministry of Justice and continues to house certain offices of the ministry. It is designated as an Important Cultural Property.

== History ==
The site was historically occupied by the residence of the Uesugi clan of the Yonezawa Domain during the Edo period. The building was constructed in 1895 from a design by the German expatriate architects Hermann Ende and Wilhelm Böckmann. Together with the Supreme Court of Judicature building, it was considered a representative work of Meiji era modern public architecture in Japan.

The building was largely unaffected by the Great Kanto Earthquake of 1923 due to its steel-reinforced construction, but was gutted during the firebombing of Tokyo in 1945, with only the exterior walls and floors remaining intact. It re-opened in 1950 with various modifications including a re-designed tiled roof.

The Ministry of Justice headquarters was relocated to a more modern 21-story office building, formally known as Central Government Office Complex No. 6-A, in 1990.

Renovations in 1994 restored the building to its original exterior appearance. Since these renovations, the building has been used to house the Research and Training Institute of the Ministry of Justice (法務総合研究所), the Library of the Ministry of Justice (法務図書館) and the Ministry of Justice Museum. It was designated as an Important Cultural Property on 27 December 1994.

== Access ==
The closest station is Sakuradamon on the Tokyo Metro Yurakucho Line.

== Gallery ==
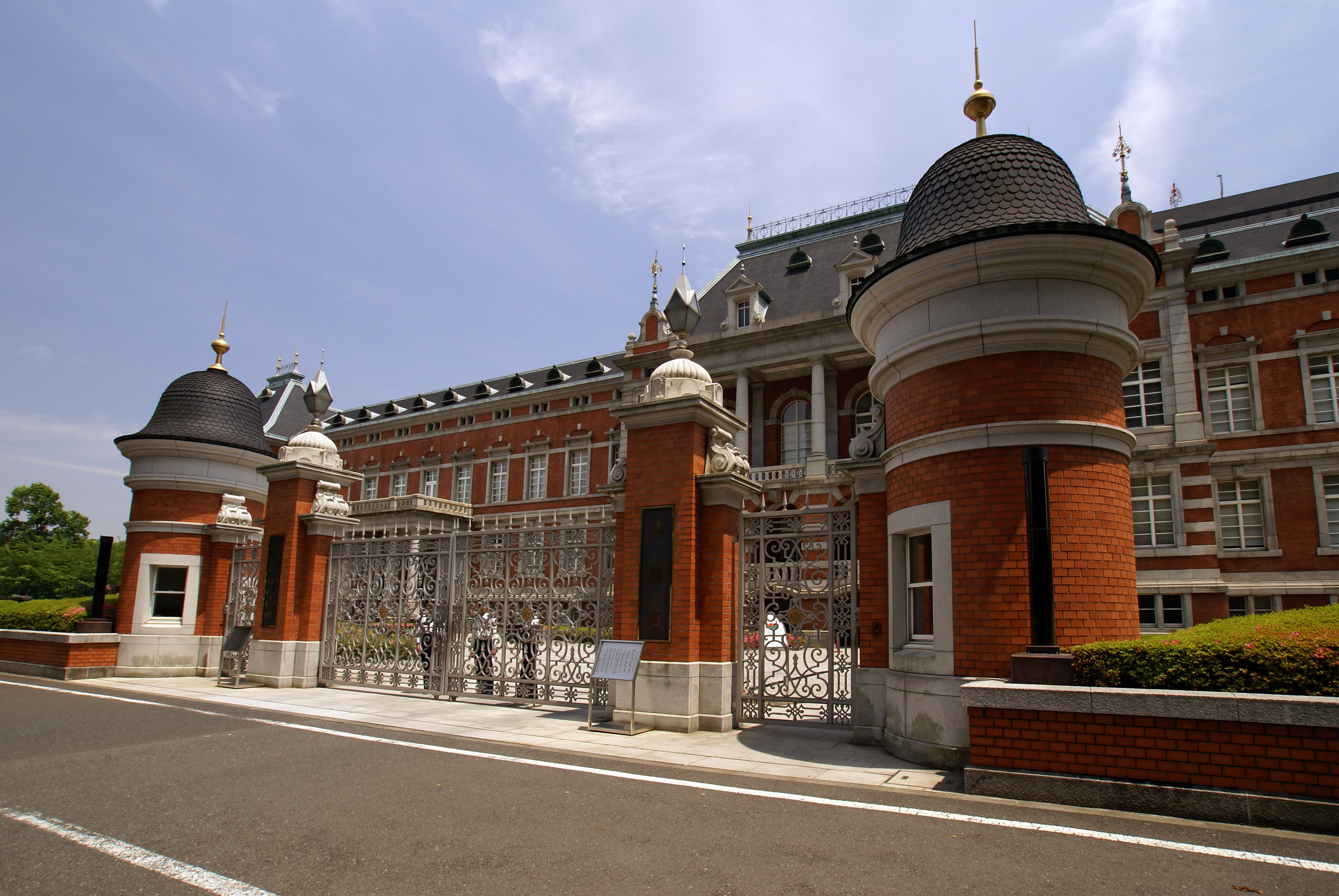
Main gate, guards

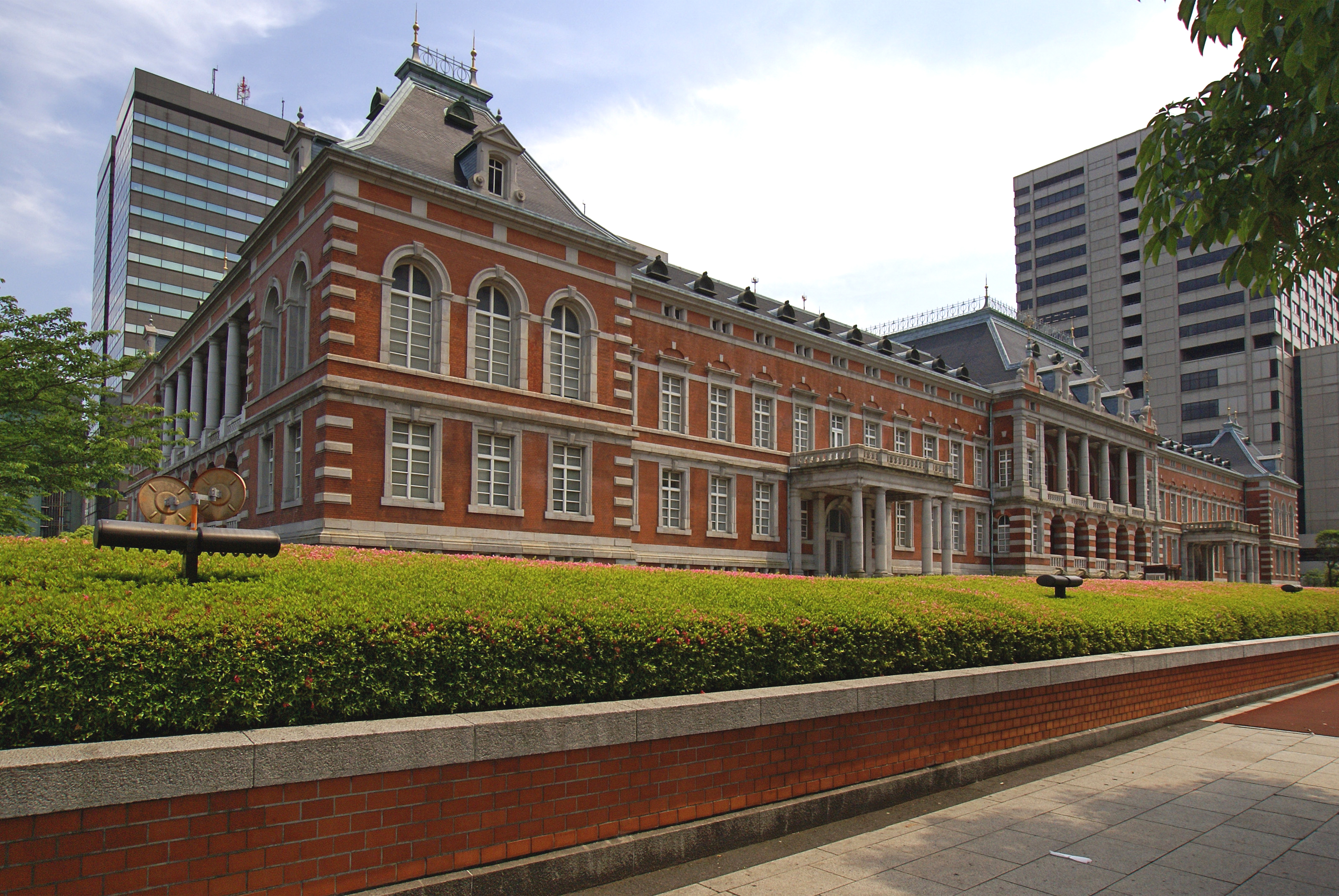
Full building

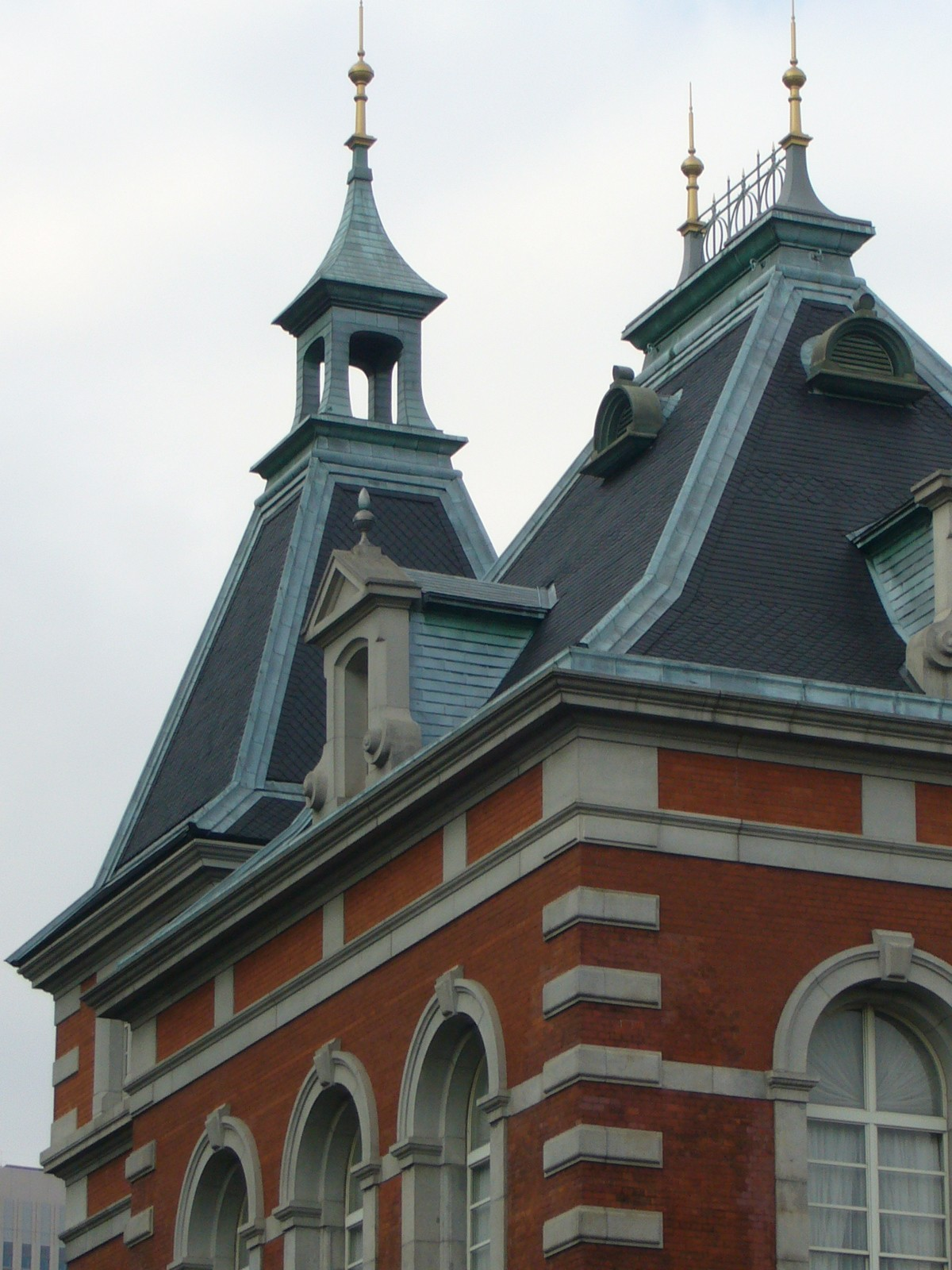
Roof

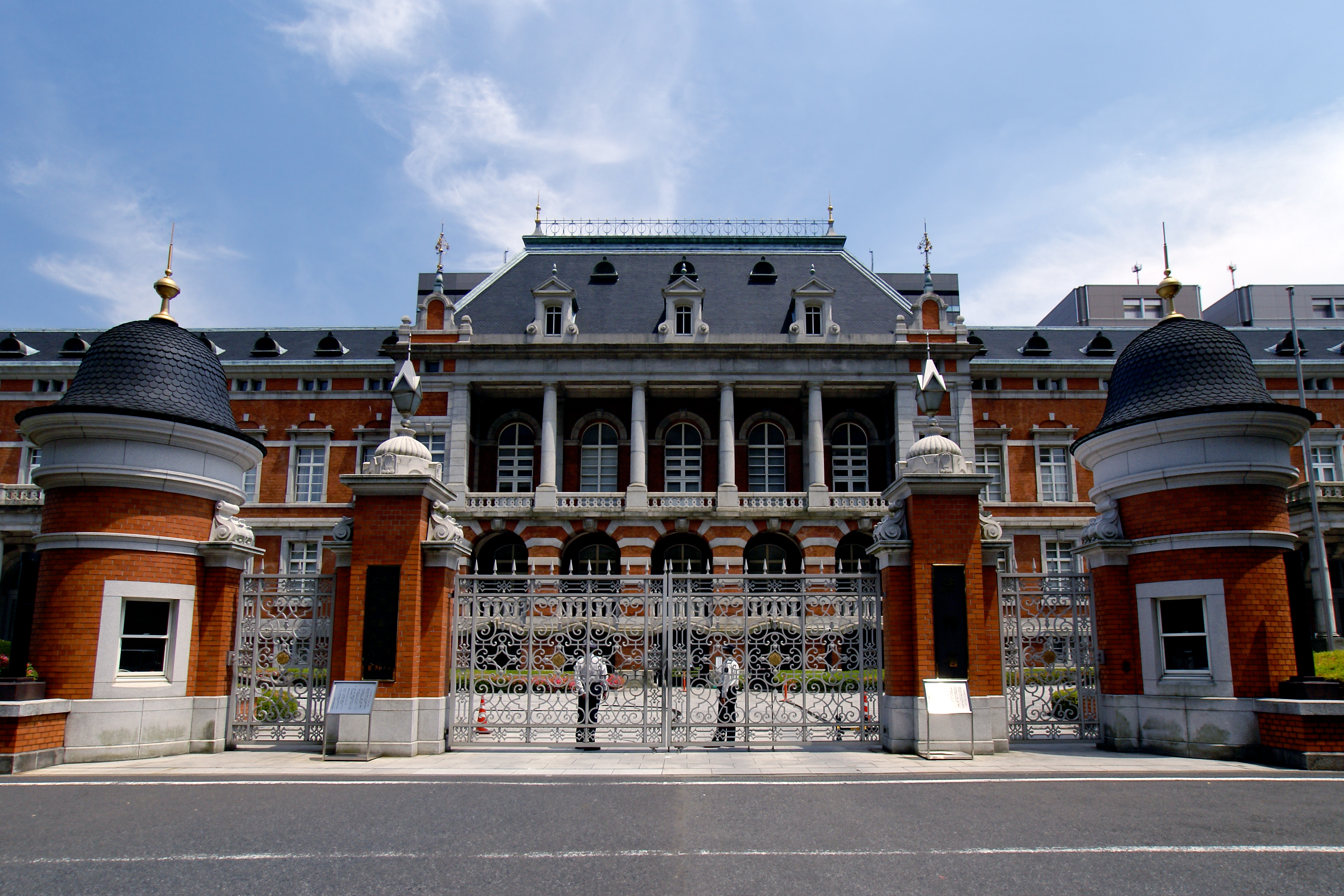
Front entrance
