= Kasumi Kaikan =

Japanese social club for descendants of the former kazoku

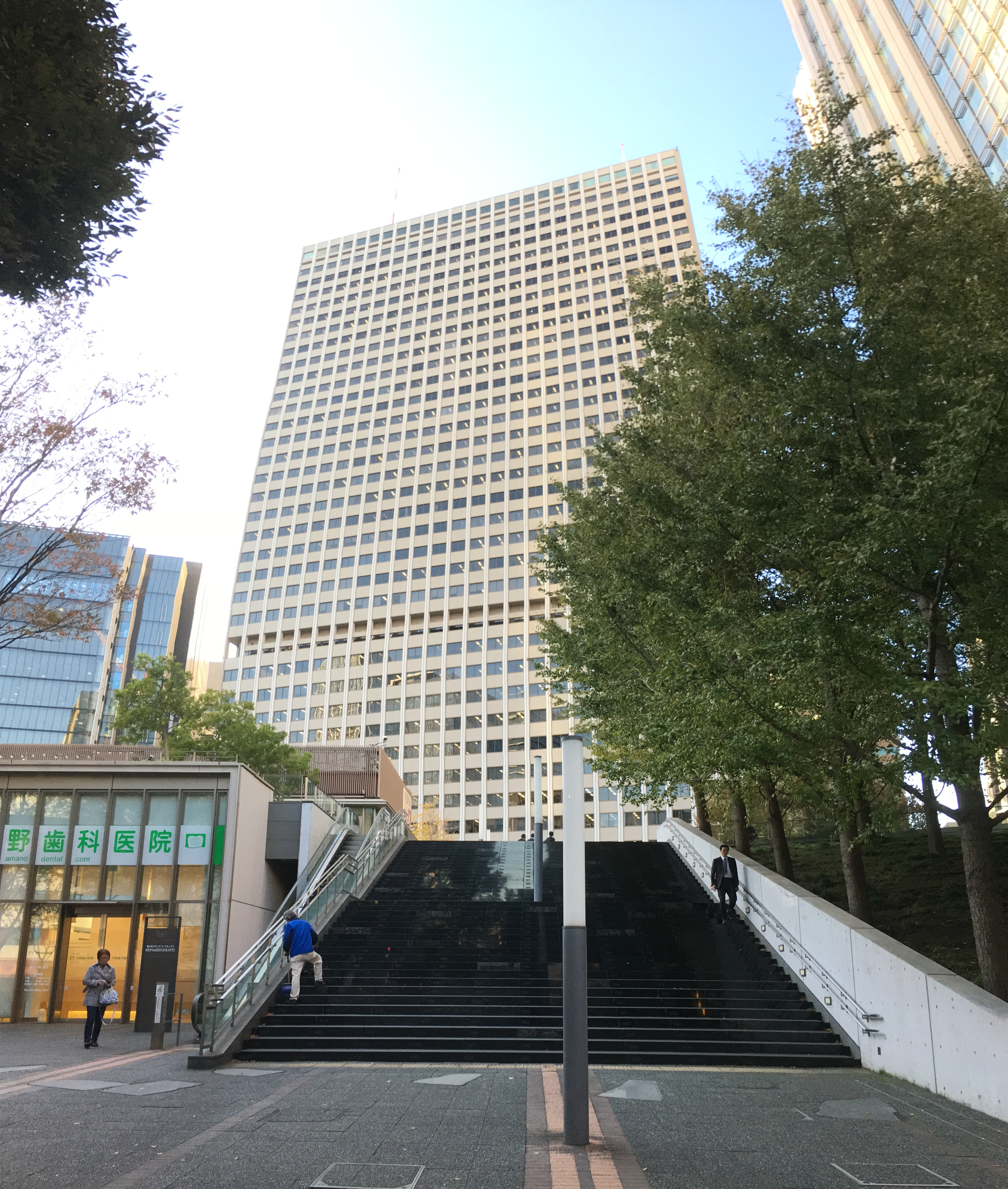
The Kasumi Kaikan has its club rooms on the top floor of the Kasumigaseki Building in Tokyo

The Kasumi Kaikan (霞会館) is the association of the former kazoku of Japan.

It was originally called the Kazoku Kaikan (華族会館, Peers' Club) and renamed in 1947 after the post-war Constitution of Japan abolished the hereditary peerage. The association used to have its headquarters in the Rokumeikan, which was replaced by the current structure. Kasumi, meaning mist, refers to the prestigious Tokyo locality Kasumigaseki from which the building takes its name. However, the club’s name is not to be taken literally. ‘Kasumi Club’ is the most appropriate rendering of Kasumi Kaikan in English.

The association is a social club, similar to a gentlemen's club but one which admits women as members. Membership is strictly limited to the 950 families of the kazoku. Members of the Imperial Family visit the club on special occasions.

Pursuant to an agreement with the developers of the Kasumigaseki Building, the Club occupies three floors within the building, one (the 34th floor) being the club’s premises, and two more being leased out by the club for rental income. The club also owns the land on which the building stands.
