= Kasumigaseki =

District in Tokyo's Chiyoda Ward

Coordinates: 35°40′31″N 139°45′11″E

Kasumigaseki 霞が関
- Central business district
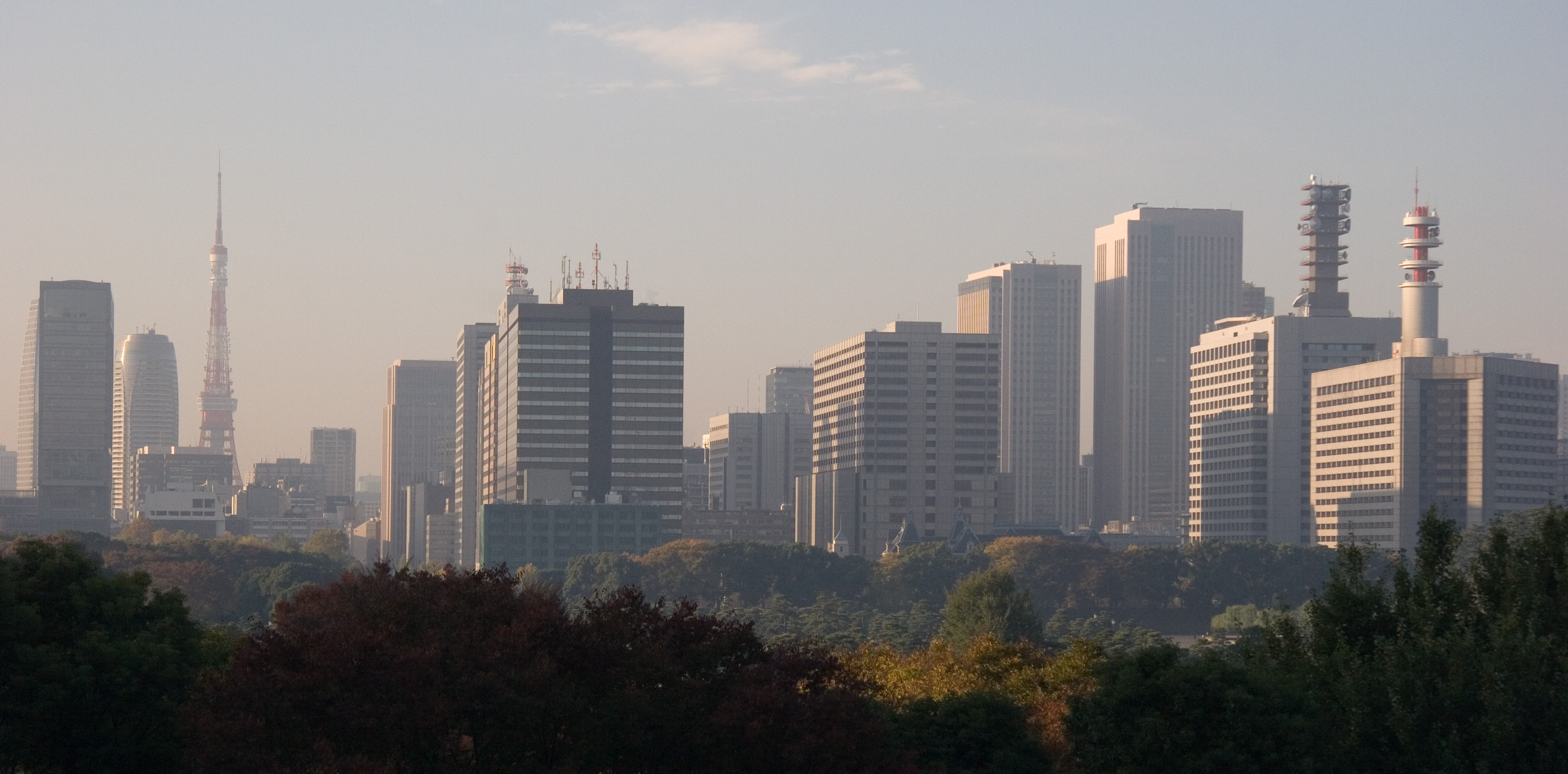
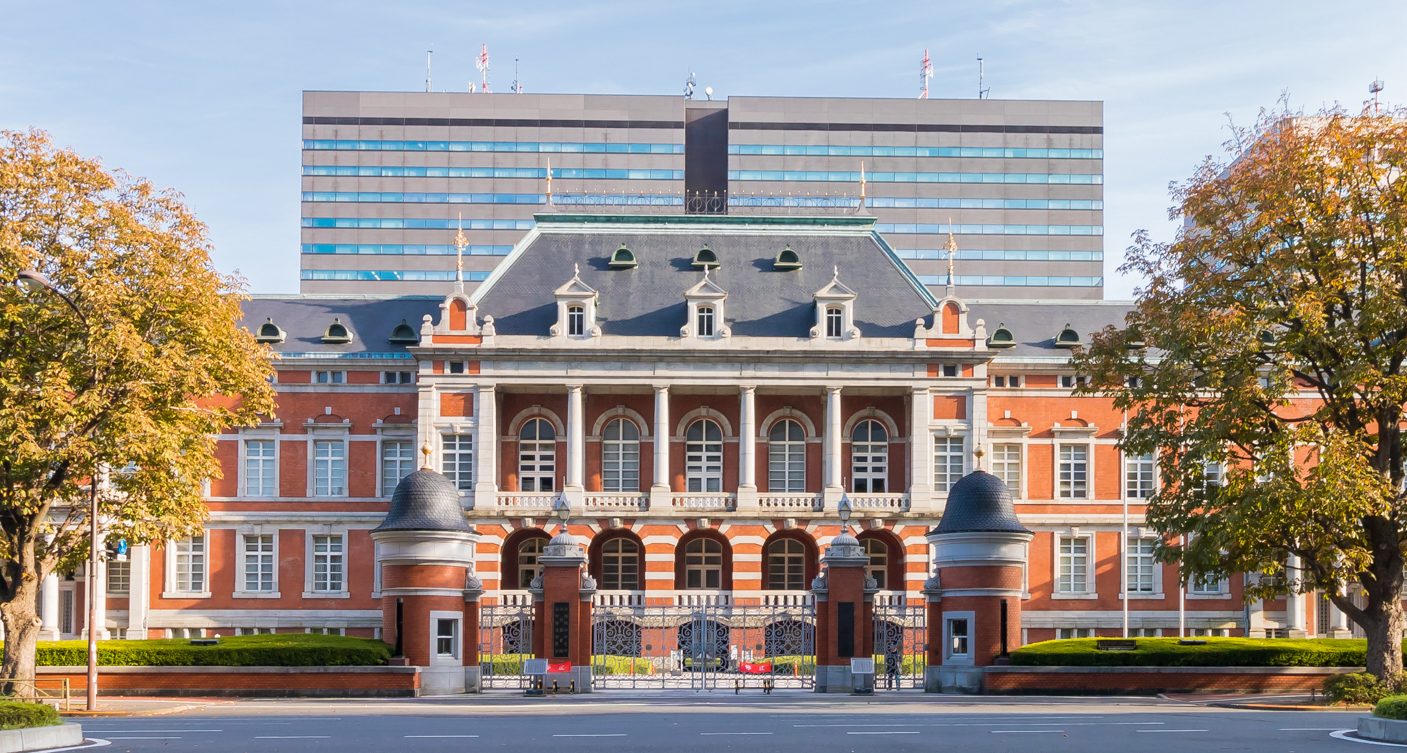
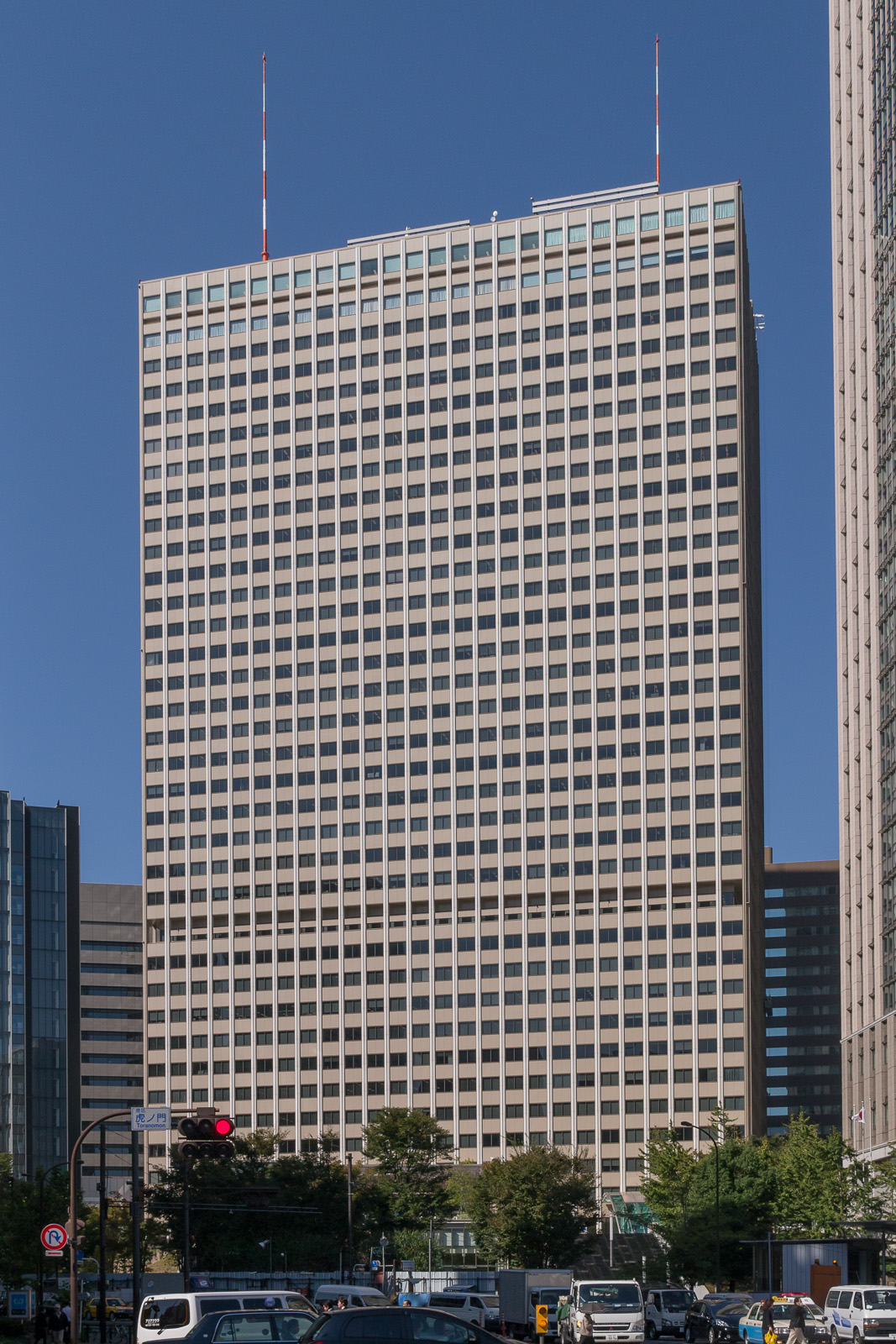
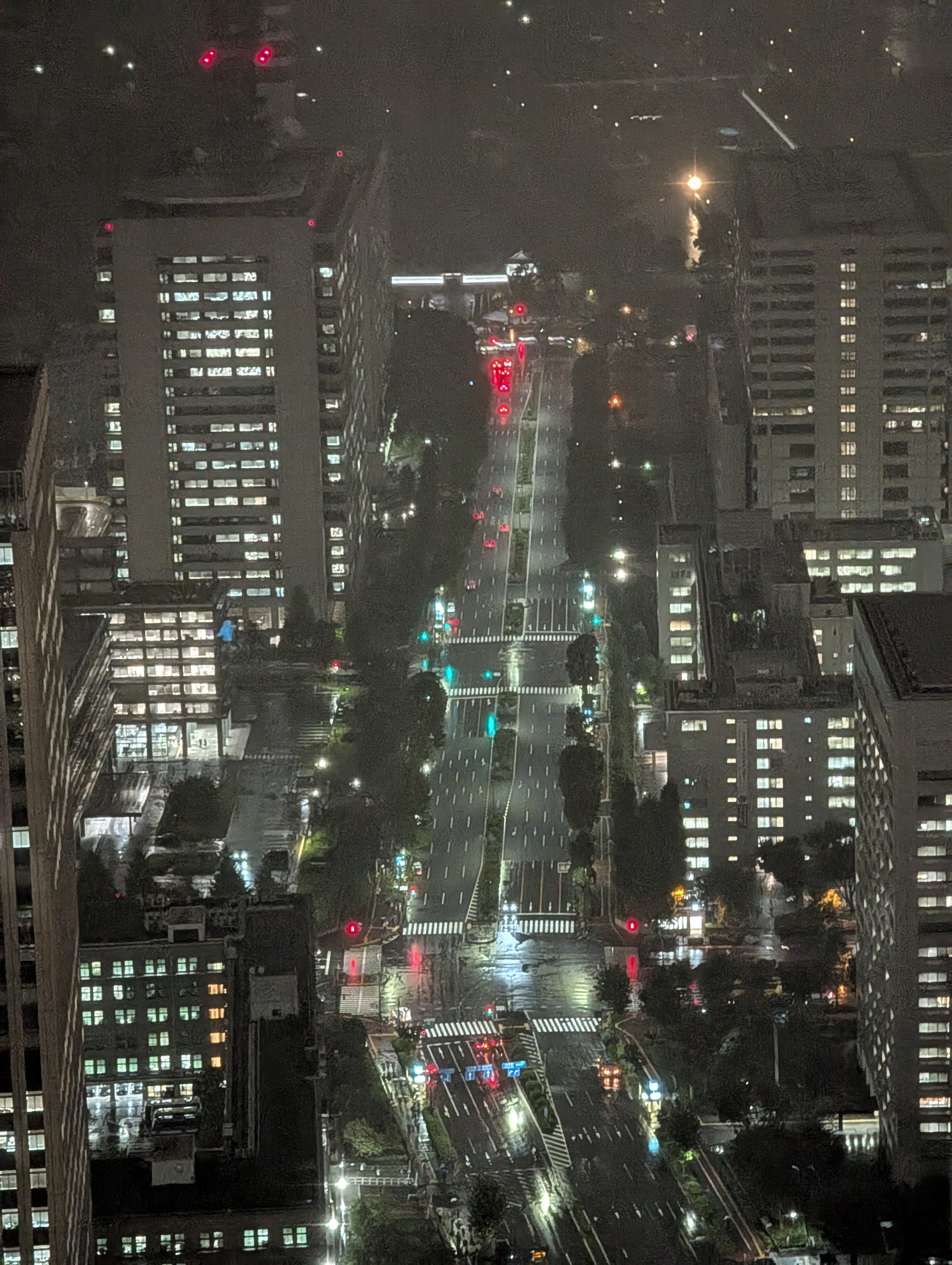
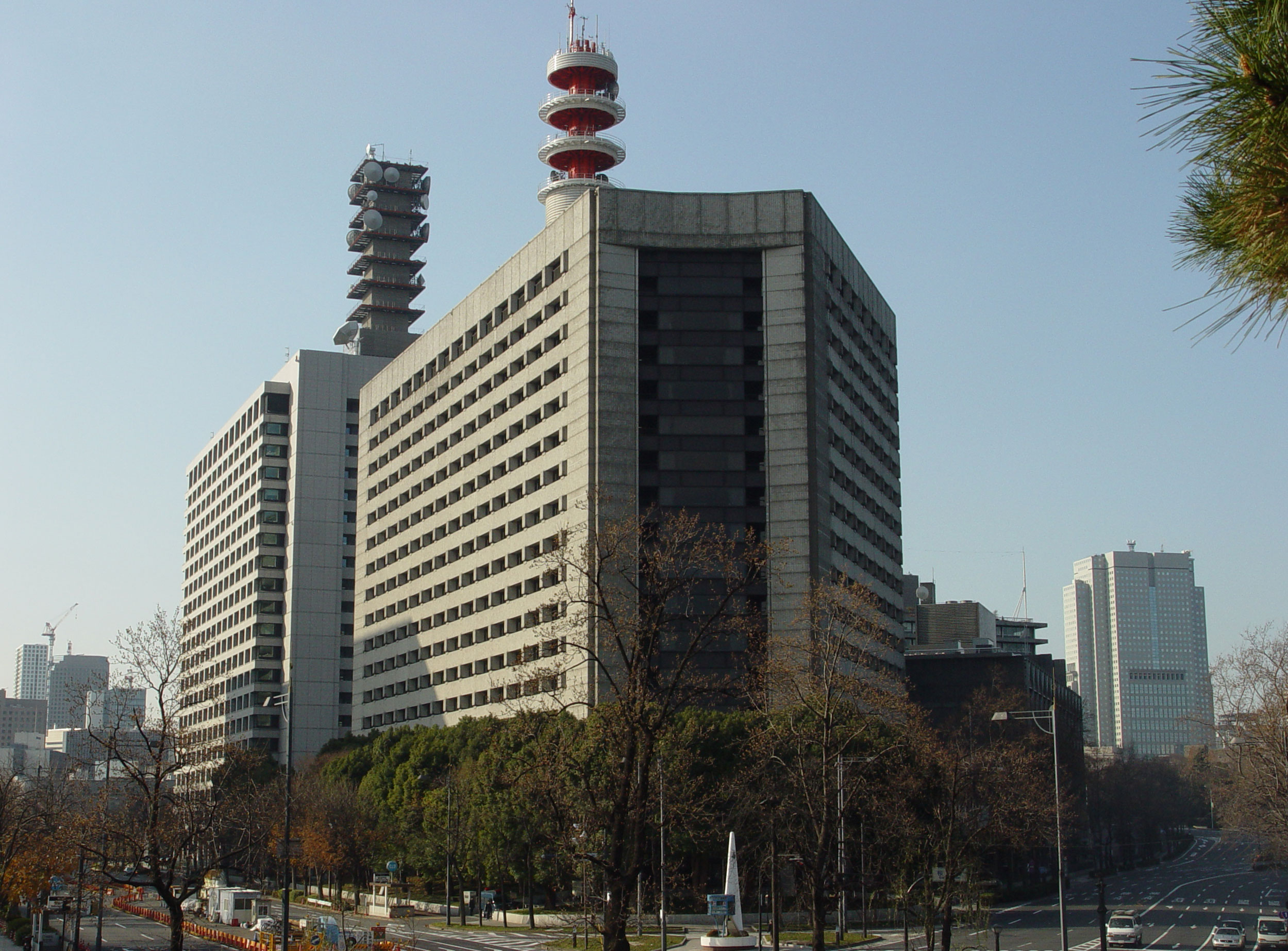
- Ministries in Kasumigaseki Old Ministry of Justice Building Kasumigaseki Building Sakurada Street (part of Route 1) Metropolitan Police
- Interactive map of Kasumigaseki

Population (2024)
  - Total: 9
- Postal code: 100-0013

Kasumigaseki (霞が関, 霞ヶ関 or 霞ケ関) is a district in Chiyoda, Tokyo. Most government ministries are located in the neighbourhood, making its name a metonym for the Japanese bureaucracy, while Nagatachō refers to the elected government or legislative branch. It faces the Imperial Palace to the north, Hibiya Park to the east, and Nagatachō to the west.

== Notable sites ==
=== Government offices ===
- 2nd Bldg. of the Central Common Government Office
  - Japan Transport Safety Board
  - National Public Safety Commission
- Fair Trade Commission
- Coast Guard
- Patent Office
- Ministry of Internal Affairs and Communications
- Ministry of Agriculture, Forestry and Fisheries
- Ministry of Economy, Trade and Industry
- Ministry of Finance
- Ministry of Foreign Affairs
- Ministry of Justice
- Ministry of Land, Infrastructure, Transport and Tourism
- Ministry of Health, Labour and Welfare
- Ministry of Education, Culture, Sports, Science and Technology
- Ministry of the Environment
- Public Security Intelligence Agency
- National Police Agency
- Financial Services Agency
- Agency for Cultural Affairs
- National Personnel Authority
- Board of Audit of Japan
- Tokyo Metropolitan Police HQ
- Tokyo High Court and Intellectual Property High Court
- Tokyo District Court, Summary Court and Family Court

=== Other buildings ===
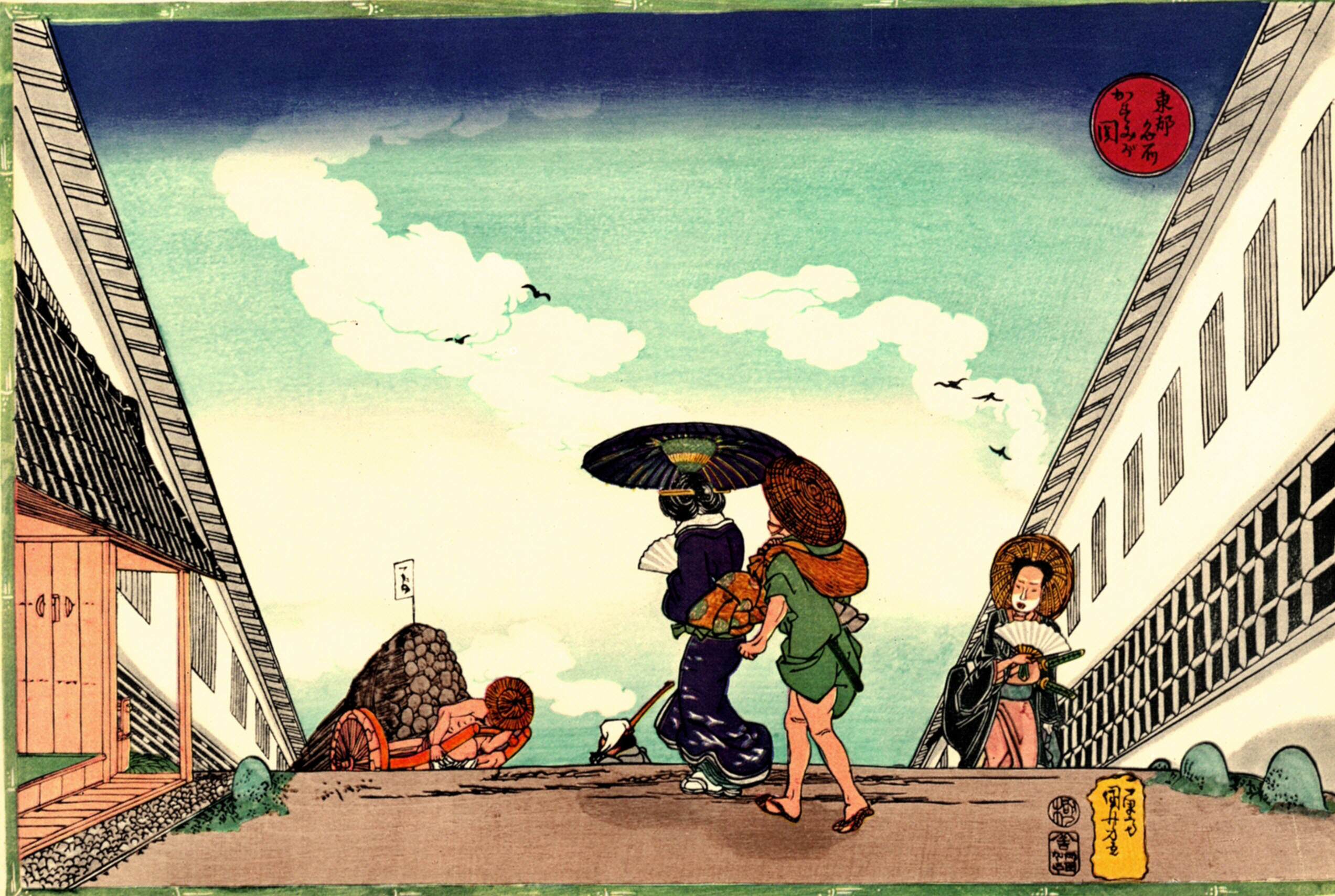
- High noon at Kasumigaseki. Ukiyo-e by Utagawa Kuniyoshi
  Japan Post headquarters
- Kasumigaseki Building - Tokyo's first high-rise office building
  - The Asian Development Bank Institute has its head office on the 8th floor of the Kasumigaseki Building. On the same floor, the Asian Development Bank has its Japan offices.
- Kasumigaseki Common Gate - Twin tower buildings adjacent to the Kasumigaseki Building.
- New Kasumigaseki Building
- Nipponkoa Insurance Building

== Subway stations ==
- Kasumigaseki Station (Chiyoda Line, Hibiya Line, Marunouchi Line)
- Sakuradamon Station (Yūrakuchō Line)
- Toranomon Station (Ginza Line)

== Economy ==
Japan Post Holdings has its headquarters in Kasumigaseki. Tokuyama Corporation has its headquarters in Kasumigaseki Common Gate West Tower and PricewaterhouseCoopers has offices on the 15th floor of the Kasumigaseki Building. Also in the Kasumigaseki Building has its headquarters the Lixil Group Corporation.

At different points of time All Nippon Airways and Mitsui Chemicals had their headquarters in the Kasumigaseki Building. In July 1978, when Nippon Cargo Airlines first began, it operated within a single room inside All Nippon Airways's space in the Kasumigaseki Building.

At one time Cantor Fitzgerald had an office in the Toranomon Mitsui Building in Kasumigaseki.

== Education ==
Chiyoda Board of Education operates public elementary and junior high schools. Kōjimachi Elementary School (千代田区立麹町小学校) is the zoned elementary of Kasumigaseki 1-3 chōme. There is a freedom of choice system for junior high schools in Chiyoda Ward, and so there are no specific junior high school zones.

== Spelling ==
The current official spelling of the district's name is 霞が関, with が in hiragana; before 1967, it was spelled 霞ヶ関, with a small ヶ. The name of the Tokyo Metro station is spelled "霞ケ関", with a large ケ. All three spellings can still be found by various institutions in the area.
