= Southeast Education Service Center =

American non-profit organization

- Company type: Non-profit organization
- Industry: Public Education
- Founded: 1971
- Headquarters: Price, Utah
- Website: http://www.seschools.org

The Southeast Education Service Center (SESC) is located in Price, Utah. SESC is one of four (SEDC, CUES and NUES) regional service centers in the State of Utah. SESC is a not-for-profit service center that supports the four public education school districts in Southeast Utah. SESC exists to provide services needed and requested by the schools/districts served.

The four school districts of Carbon County, Emery County, Grand County and San Juan County make up the Southeast Region of Utah. These four districts encompass 17,455 of Utah's 84,916 square miles (219,930 km^{2}), or 21% of the Utah's total area. There are nine states within the United States that are smaller than 17,455 square miles (45,210 km^{2}) in total area.

== History ==
Utah's Regional Service Centers were founded in the 1970s and authorized by the Utah State Legislature under the direction of the Utah State Office of Education (USOE) rule R277-456-1.

== Services ==
SESC provides the following requested services:

- Technology
  - Regional Coordination
  - Network Engineering
  - Technical Support
  - Integration Training
- Reading/Literacy Training and Support
- Instructional Media Distribution and Duplication
- Student Assessment Results Training and Support
- Educational Professional Development
- Grant Writing and Support
