= Asian Development Bank Institute =

Organization based in Tokyo, Japan

- Founded: 1996; 30 years ago
- Founder: Asian Development Bank
- Type: think tank
- Purpose: Research and capacity building
- Location: Chiyoda, Tokyo
- Coordinates: 35.6712°N 139.7473°E
- Region served: Predominantly Asia
- Owner: Asian Development Bank
- Key people: Bambang Brodjonegoro, Dean
- Endowment: Government of Japan
- Employees: About 90

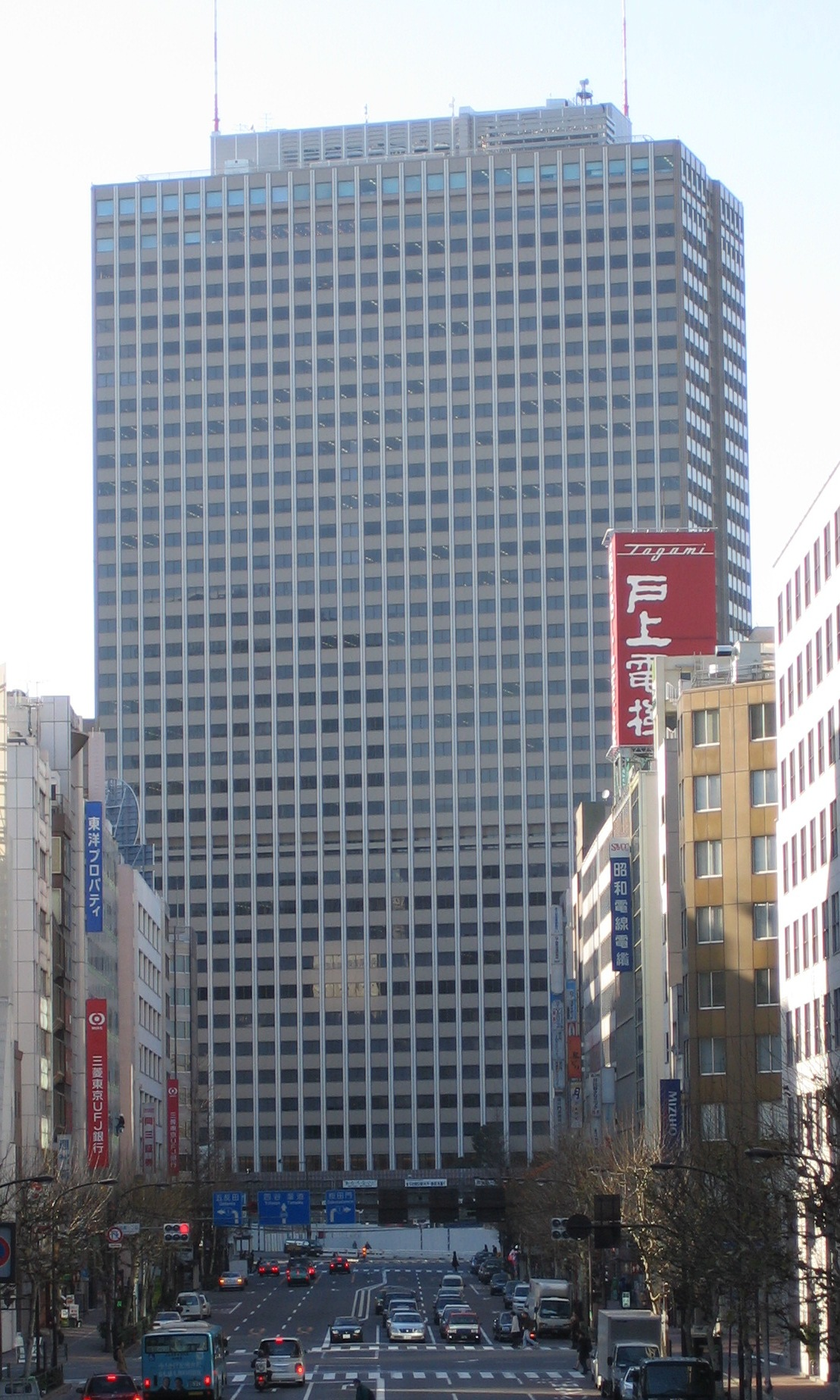
The ADBI is on the eighth floor of the Kasumigaseki Building in Tokyo.

The Asian Development Bank Institute (ADBI) is an Asian think tank focused on identifying effective development strategies for Asia and the Pacific, and on providing support to ADB member countries in managing development challenges. It was established in Tokyo in 1996 as a subsidiary of Asian Development Bank, with initial and subsequent financing from the Government of Japan. ADBI is located on the 8th floor of the Kasumigaseki Building in Kasumigaseki, Chiyoda, Tokyo. ADBI was ranked 1st in the world among government-affiliated think tanks in the 2020 Global Go To Think Tanks Index Report by the Think Tanks and Civil Societies Program of the University of Pennsylvania.

== Origins ==
In May 1996, at the twenty-ninth annual meeting of the Asian Development Bank (ADB), the Government of Japan offered to cover the cost of operating and establishing the ADB Institute to address the needs for strengthening the capacity of public and other developmental institutions in developing member countries (DMCs). The proposal was approved on 24 September 1996 and the institute was officially inaugurated in Tokyo on 10 December 1997.

The first Dean of the ADB Institute was the leading Filipino economist Jesus Estanislao.

== Operations ==
ADBI is a subsidiary body of ADB. The ADB Board of Governors exercises the same oversight responsibilities over ADBI as for the rest of ADB, including approval for its work program and budget. In 2007 Government of Japan provided $14.2 million for ADBI under its Institute Special Fund scheme.

ADBI's work covers applied research, policy seminars designed to disseminate thinking about best practices, and a range of capacity building and training (CBT) initiatives.

== Recent publications ==
Transitioning From Low-Income Growth To High-Income Growth: Is There A Middle-Income Trap? David Busman, Maya Eden, Ha Nguyen, January 2017
