= Financial Services Agency =

Japanese financial regulatory agency

- 金融庁; Kin'yū-chō

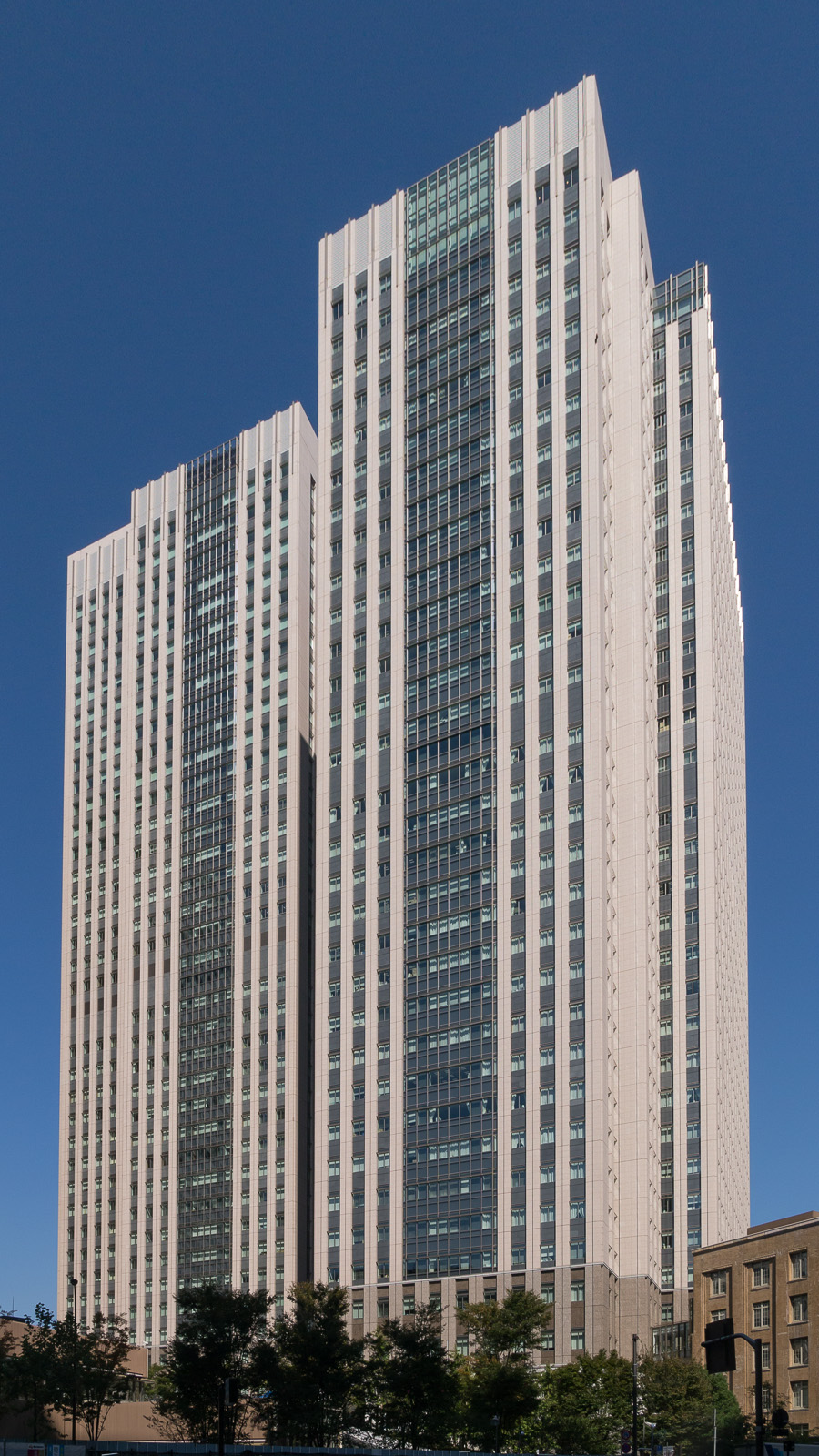
- Kasumigaseki Common Gate West Building

Agency overview
- Formed: July 1, 2000
- Jurisdiction: Japan
- Headquarters: 3-2-1 Kasumigaseki, Chiyoda-ku, Tokyo, Japan
- Ministers responsible: Satsuki Katayama, Minister of State for Financial Services; Kazuchika Iwata, State Minister; Yozo Kaneko, Parliamentary Vice-Minister
- Agency executive: Yutaka Itō, Commissioner
- Parent agency: Cabinet Office
- Website: www.fsa.go.jp

The Financial Services Agency (金融庁, Kin'yū-chō; FSA) is a Japanese government agency and an integrated financial regulator responsible for overseeing banking, securities and exchange, and insurance sectors in order to ensure the stability of the financial system of Japan. The agency operates with a Commissioner and reports to the Minister of State for Financial Services. It oversees the Securities and Exchange Surveillance Commission and the Certified Public Accountants and Auditing Oversight Board. Its main office is located in Tokyo.

== History ==
The FSA was established on July 1, 2000 by the merger of the Financial Supervisory Agency with the Financial System Planning Bureau, a bureau of the Ministry of Finance. The Financial Supervisory Agency had been established in 1998, amid severe instability in the Japanese financial system, to conduct concentrated inspections of Japanese financial institutions in coordination with the Bank of Japan. The FSA was under the supervision of the Financial Reconstruction Commission (FRC) until January 2001, when the FRC was abolished and the FSA became directly subordinate to the Cabinet Office through a State Minister.

== Organization ==
The FSA consists of the following organizations:

- Banking and Securities Supervision Bureau
- Planning and Market Bureau
- Asset Management and Insurance Supervision Bureau
- Securities and Exchange Surveillance Commission
- Certified Public Accountants and Auditing Oversight Board

A portion of the FSA's inspection and supervision authority with regard to local financial institutions is delegated to Local Finance Bureaus and Local Finance Offices throughout Japan. These are organs of the Ministry of Finance but are directed and supervised by the FSA Commissioner in this capacity.

== Cabinet Ministers ==
Name	From	To	Prime Minister
Hakuo Yanagisawa	January 6, 2001	September 30, 2002	Mori Koizumi
Heizo Takenaka	September 30, 2002	September 27, 2004	Koizumi
Tatsuya Ito	September 27, 2004	October 31, 2005	Koizumi
Kaoru Yosano	October 31, 2005	September 26, 2006	Koizumi
Yuji Yamamoto	September 26, 2006	August 27, 2007	Abe
Yoshimi Watanabe	August 27, 2007	August 2, 2008	Abe Fukuda
Toshimitsu Motegi	August 2, 2008	September 24, 2008	Fukuda
Shoichi Nakagawa	September 24, 2008	February 17, 2009	Aso
Kaoru Yosano	February 17, 2009	September 16, 2009	Aso
Shizuka Kamei	September 16, 2009	June 11, 2010	Hatoyama Kan
Yoshito Sengoku (acting)	June 11, 2010	June 11, 2010	Kan
Shozaburo Jimi	June 11, 2010	June 4, 2012	Kan Noda
Tadahiro Matsushita	June 4, 2012	September 10, 2012	Noda
Jun Azumi (acting)	September 10, 2012	October 1, 2012	Noda
Ikko Nakatsuka	October 1, 2012	December 26, 2012	Noda
Taro Aso	December 26, 2012	October 4, 2021	Abe Suga
Shunichi Suzuki	October 4, 2021	October 1, 2024	Kishida
Katsunobu Kato	October 1, 2024	October 21, 2025	Shigeru Ishiba
Satsuki Katayama	October 21, 2025	Current	Sanae Takaichi

== See also ==
- Financial Services Authority
- Securities commission
- List of financial supervisory authorities by country
