= Securities and Exchange Surveillance Commission =

Japanese financial regulatory organization

The Securities and Exchange Surveillance Commission (証券取引等監視委員会, shouken torihikitou kanshi iinkai; SESC) is a Japanese commission which comes under the authority of the Financial Services Agency. It is responsible for “ensuring fair transactions in both securities and financial futures markets.”

Its current Chairman is Mitsuhiro Hasegawa, who assumed the post in 2017. There are two chairmen, Shinya Fukuda, and Masayuki Yoshida.

== History ==
The SESC was formally established on July 20, 1992, in the wake of a number of 1991 scandals related to securities companies. In June 1998, the Financial Supervisory Agency and the SESC were split off from the Ministry of Finance, and the Financial Supervisory Agency became the Financial Services Agency.

== Structure ==
The SESC has five objectives, and a division to handle each one:

- Market Surveillance
- Compliance Inspection
- Disclosure Document Inspection
- Administrative Civil Monetary Penalties Investigation
- Enforcement-Investigation and Filing Criminal Charges

== See also ==
- List of financial supervisory authorities by country
