= Kasumigaseki Building =

Skyscraper in Tokyo, Japan

- 霞が関ビルディング
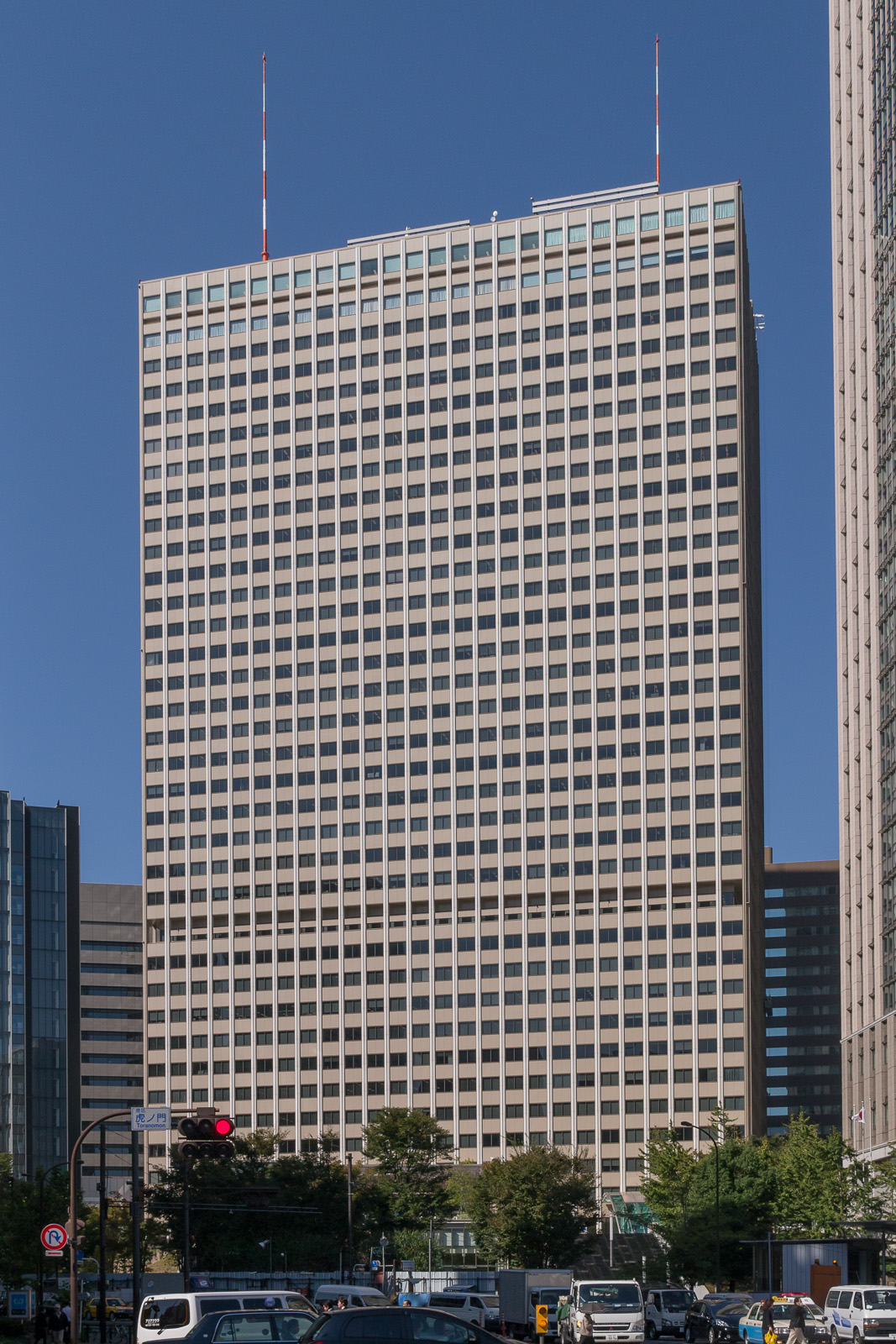
- Kasumigaseki Building in 2012

Record height
- Tallest in Japan from 1968 to 1970^{[I]}
- Preceded by: Hotel New Otani Tokyo
- Surpassed by: Tokyo World Trade Center Building

General information
- Status: Completed
- Type: Mixed-use
- Location: 3-2-5 Kasumigaseki; Chiyoda, Tokyo, Japan
- Coordinates: 35°40′17″N 139°44′50″E
- Construction started: March 1965
- Completed: 1968
- Opening: April 1968
- Owner: Kasumi Kaikan Incorporated Association; Mitsui Fudosan

Height
- Roof: 512 feet (156 m)

Technical details
- Floor count: 36 above ground 3 below ground
- Floor area: 153,234 square meters (1,649,400 ft^{2})
- Lifts/elevators: 29 passenger and 6 freight, by Toyo Otis and Hitachi
- Grounds: 16,320 square meters (175,700 ft^{2})

Design and construction
- Architect: Kajima Construction

The Kasumigaseki Building (霞が関ビルディング, Kasumigaseki birudingu) is a 36-story skyscraper located in Kasumigaseki, Chiyoda, Tokyo.

== History ==
The building is owned by the Kasumi Kaikan (霞会館), an association of the former kazoku high nobility. The plot was once owned by the Kazoku Kaikan (華族会館), the previous association, which was changed after World War II in 1947.

Completed in 1968, the building is widely regarded as the first modern office skyscraper in Japan. The reason high-rise buildings were not built in the country earlier was that Japan's Building Standard Law set an absolute height limit of 31 meters (102 ft) until 1963, when the limit was abolished in favor of a Floor Area Ratio limit.

== Tenants ==
The Asian Development Bank Institute has its head office on the 8th floor of the Kasumigaseki Building. On the same floor, the Asian Development Bank has its Japan offices. Children and Families Agency has its head office on this building.

At one time All Nippon Airways had its headquarters in the building, as did Mitsui Chemicals. In July 1978, when Nippon Cargo Airlines first began, it operated within a single room inside All Nippon Airways's space in the Kasumigaseki Building.

Two airlines, Garuda Indonesia and Union de Transports Aériens, at one time had offices in the building.

PwC had offices on the 15th floor of the building.

The Kasumi Kaikan has their club rooms on the 34th floor and is strictly for members only, namely descendants of the kazoku.

Kasumigaseki Building Post Office on the 3rd floor

== In popular culture ==
The Kasumigaseki Building is the main subject of the film Chōkōsō no Akebono, which was backed by Kajima Construction, the company that built the Kasumigaseki Building. The building was often used for comparison to things with large volumes in Japan which continued until the construction of the Tokyo Dome, a huge indoor stadium.

Records
Preceded by Hotel New Otani Tokyo	Tallest building in Japan; 156 m (512 ft); 1968–1970	Succeeded by World Trade Center Building
Preceded by Hotel New Otani Tokyo	Tallest building in Tokyo; 156 m (512 ft); 1968–1970	Succeeded by World Trade Center Building
