= Forth Bridge =

Railway bridge over the Firth of Forth in Scotland

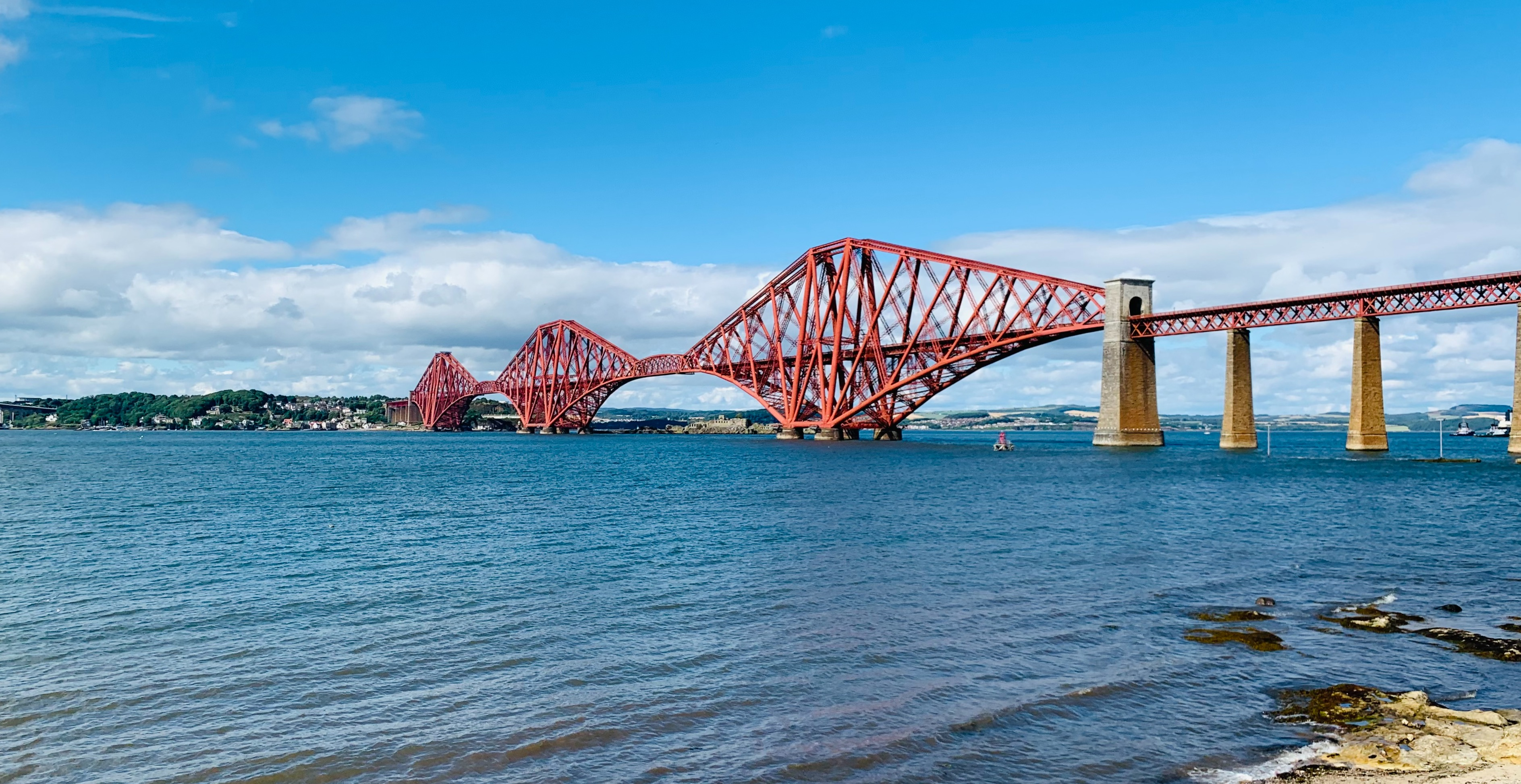
- Forth Bridge in July 2022
- Coordinates: 56.0004°N 3.3886°W
- OS grid reference: NT 13554 79252
- Carries: Rail traffic
- Crosses: Firth of Forth
- Locale: Edinburgh, Inchgarvie and Fife, Scotland
- Other name: Forth Rail Bridge
- Named for: River Forth
- Owner: Network Rail
- Maintained by: Balfour Beatty under contract to Network Rail
- Preceded by: Forth Road Bridge

Characteristics
- Design: Cantilever bridge
- Material: Steel
- Total length: 8,094 feet (2,467 m)
- Width: 120 ft (37 m) at piers 32 ft (9.8 m) at centre
- Height: 361 ft (110 m) above high water
- Longest span: Two of 1,700 feet (520 m)

History
- Designer: Sir John Fowler and Sir Benjamin Baker
- Construction start: 1882
- Construction end: December 1889
- Opened: 4 March 1890

UNESCO World Heritage Site
- Official name: The Forth Bridge
- Type: Cultural
- Criteria: i, iv
- Designated: 5 July 2015
- Reference no.: 1485

Listed Building – Category A
- Official name: Forth Bridge
- Designated: 18 June 1973
- Reference no.: LB40370

Location
- Interactive map of Forth Bridge

The Forth Bridge is a cantilever railway bridge across the Firth of Forth in the east of Scotland, 9 miles (14 kilometres) west of central Edinburgh. Completed in 1890, it is considered a symbol of Scotland (having been voted Scotland's greatest man-made wonder in 2016), and is a UNESCO World Heritage Site. It was designed by English engineers Sir John Fowler and Sir Benjamin Baker. It is sometimes referred to as the Forth Rail Bridge (to distinguish it from the adjacent Forth Road Bridge), although this is not its official name.

Construction of the bridge began in 1882 and it was opened on 4 March 1890 by the Duke of Rothesay, the future Edward VII. The bridge carries the Edinburgh–Aberdeen line across the Forth between the villages of South Queensferry and North Queensferry and has a total length of 2,467 metres (8,094 ft). When it opened it had the longest single cantilever bridge span in the world, until 1919 when the single 1,801 ft (549 m) span Quebec Bridge in Canada was completed. It continues to be the world's second-longest single cantilever span, with two spans of 1,709 feet (521 m).

The bridge and its associated railway infrastructure are owned by Network Rail.

== Background ==
=== Earlier proposals ===
Before the construction of the bridge, ferries were used to cross the Firth. In 1806, a pair of tunnels, one for each direction, was proposed, and in 1818 James Anderson produced a design for a three-span suspension bridge close to the site of the present one. Calling for approximately 2,500 tonnes (2,500 long tons; 2,800 short tons) of iron, Wilhelm Westhofen said of it "and this quantity [of iron] distributed over the length would have given it a very light and slender appearance, so light indeed that on a dull day it would hardly have been visible, and after a heavy gale probably no longer to be seen on a clear day either".

For the railway age, Thomas Bouch designed for the Edinburgh and Northern Railway a roll-on/roll-off ferry between Granton and Burntisland that opened in 1850, which proved so successful that another was ordered for the Tay. In late 1863, a joint project between the North British Railway and Edinburgh and Glasgow Railway, which would merge in 1865, appointed Stephenson and Toner to design a bridge for the Forth, but the commission was given to Bouch around six months later.

It had proven difficult to engineer a suspension bridge that was able to carry railway traffic, and Thomas Bouch, engineer to the North British Railway (NBR) and Edinburgh and Glasgow Railway, was in 1863–1864 working on a single-track girder bridge crossing the Forth near Charlestown, where the river is around 2 miles (3.2 km) wide, but mostly relatively shallow. The promoters, however, were concerned about the ability to set foundations in the silty river bottom, as borings had gone as deep as 231 feet (70 m) into the mud without finding rock, but Bouch conducted experiments to demonstrate that it was possible for the silt to support considerable weight. Experiments in late 1864 with weighted caissons achieved a pressure of 5 t/sq ft (4.9 long ton/sq ft; 5.5 short ton/sq ft) on the silt, encouraging Bouch to continue with the design. In August 1865, Richard Hodgson, chairman of the NBR, proposed that the company invest £18,000 to try a different kind of foundation, as the weighted caissons had not been successful. Bouch proposed using a large pine platform underneath the piers, 80 by 60 by 7 feet (24.4 m × 18.3 m × 2.1 m) (the original design called for a 114 by 80 by 9 feet (34.7 m × 24.4 m × 2.7 m) platform of green beech) weighed down with 10,000 tonnes (9,800 long tons; 11,000 short tons) of pig iron which would sink the wooden platform to the level of the silt. The platform was launched on 14 June 1866 after some difficulty in getting it to move down the greased planks it rested on, and then moored in the harbour for six weeks pending completion. The bridge project was aborted just before the platform was sunk as the NBR expected to lose "through traffic" following the amalgamation of the Caledonian Railway and the Scottish North Eastern Railway. In September 1866, a committee of shareholders investigating rumours of financial difficulties found that accounts had been falsified, and the chairman and the entire board had resigned by November. By mid-1867 the NBR was nearly bankrupt, and all work on the Forth and Tay bridges was stopped.

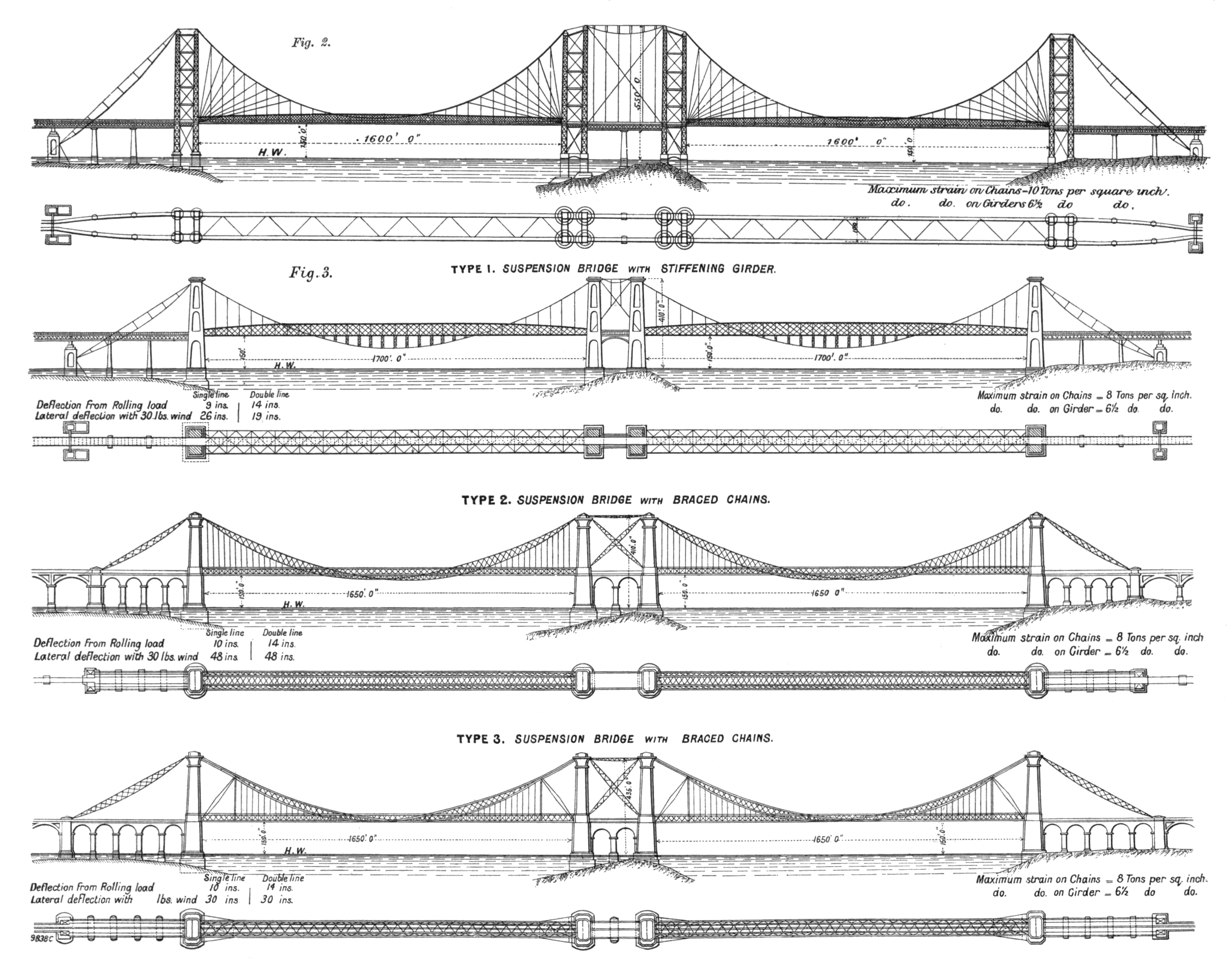
Bouch's proposed bridge (top) along with other proposals on the same principle

Forth Bridge Railway Act 1873
- Act of Parliament
- Parliament of the United Kingdom
- Long title: An Act to authorise the construction of the Forth Bridge Railway.
- Citation: 36 & 37 Vict. c. ccxxxvii

Dates
- Royal assent: 5 August 1873

Text of statute as originally enacted

The North British Railway took over the ferry at Queensferry in 1867, and completed a rail link from Ratho in 1868, establishing a contiguous link with Fife. Interest in bridging the Forth increased again, and in 1871 Bouch proposed a stiffened steel suspension bridge on roughly the same line as taken by the present rail bridge. This design was examined and pronounced acceptable by W. H. Barlow and William Pole, both "eminent" civil engineers, and Parliament in August 1873 passed the Forth Bridge Railway Act 1873 (36 & 37 Vict. c. ccxxxvii) authorising its construction. Work started in September 1878, in the form of a brick pier at the western end of the mid-Forth island of Inchgarvie.

After the Tay Bridge collapsed in 1879, confidence in Bouch dried up and the work stopped. The public inquiry into the disaster, chaired by Henry Cadogan Rothery, found the Tay Bridge to be "badly designed, badly constructed and badly maintained", with Bouch being "mainly to blame" for the defects in construction and maintenance and "entirely responsible" for the defects in design. In particular, Bouch had failed to properly account for the effect that high winds would have on the bridge, and in response to this finding the Board of Trade imposed a requirement that all bridges be designed to accept a lateral wind loading of 56 lb/sq ft (270 kg/m^{2}).

Bouch's 1871 design for the Forth Bridge fell significantly short of this figure, as – on the advice of the Astronomer Royal – he had assumed a wind loading of only 10 lb/sq ft (49 kg/m^{2}). This had been accepted by Barlow and Pole in their 1873 assessment of the design, though they qualified in their report that "[while] we raise no object to Mr. Bouch's system, we do not commit ourselves to an opinion that it is the best possible". (Note: J. S. Shipway states in Paxton 1990 that the 10 lb/sq ft figure "[seems] to have been the norm for design in the UK at that time", and notes that Bouch's design "seemingly gained Parliamentary and Board of Trade approval without any detailed invesitgation other than the private report by Barlow and Pole ...")

Bouch's design was formally abandoned on 13 January 1881, and Sir John Fowler, W. H. Barlow, and T. E. Harrison, consulting engineers to the project, were invited to propose new designs. Bouch's Inchgarvie pier was left in place, protruding approximately 7 ft (2 m) from the water at high tide. It lies directly under the present bridge and was equipped with a small navigational light c. 1887.

== Design ==
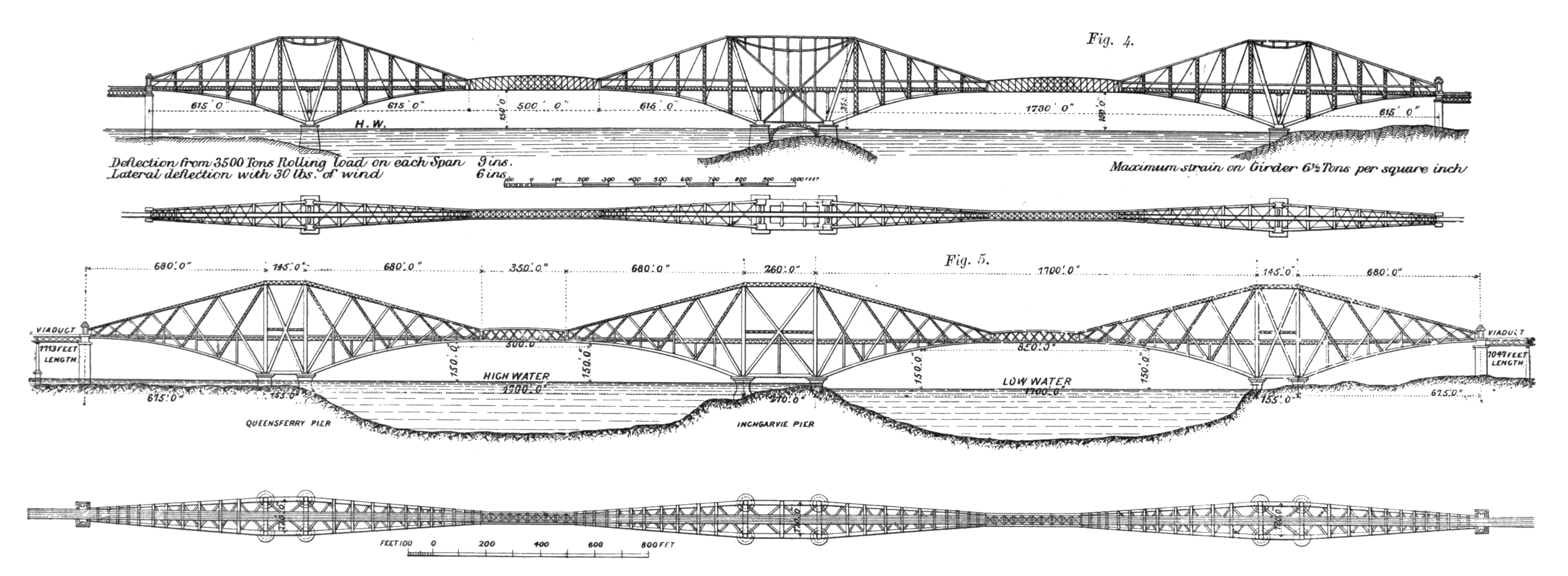
The original (above) and final (below) designs of the Forth Bridge

=== Dimensions ===
The bridge spans the Forth between the villages of South Queensferry and North Queensferry and has a total length of 8,094 feet (2,467 m) with the double track elevated 150 feet (45.72 m) above the water level at high tide. It consists of two main spans of 1,700 feet (518.16 m), two side spans of 680 ft (207.3 m), and 15 approach spans of 168 ft (51.2 m). Each main span consists of two 680 ft (207.3 m) cantilever arms supporting a central 350 feet (106.7 m) span truss. The weight of the bridge superstructure was 50,513 long tons (51,324 t), including the 6.5 million rivets used. The bridge also used 640,000 cubic feet (18,122 m^{3}) of granite.

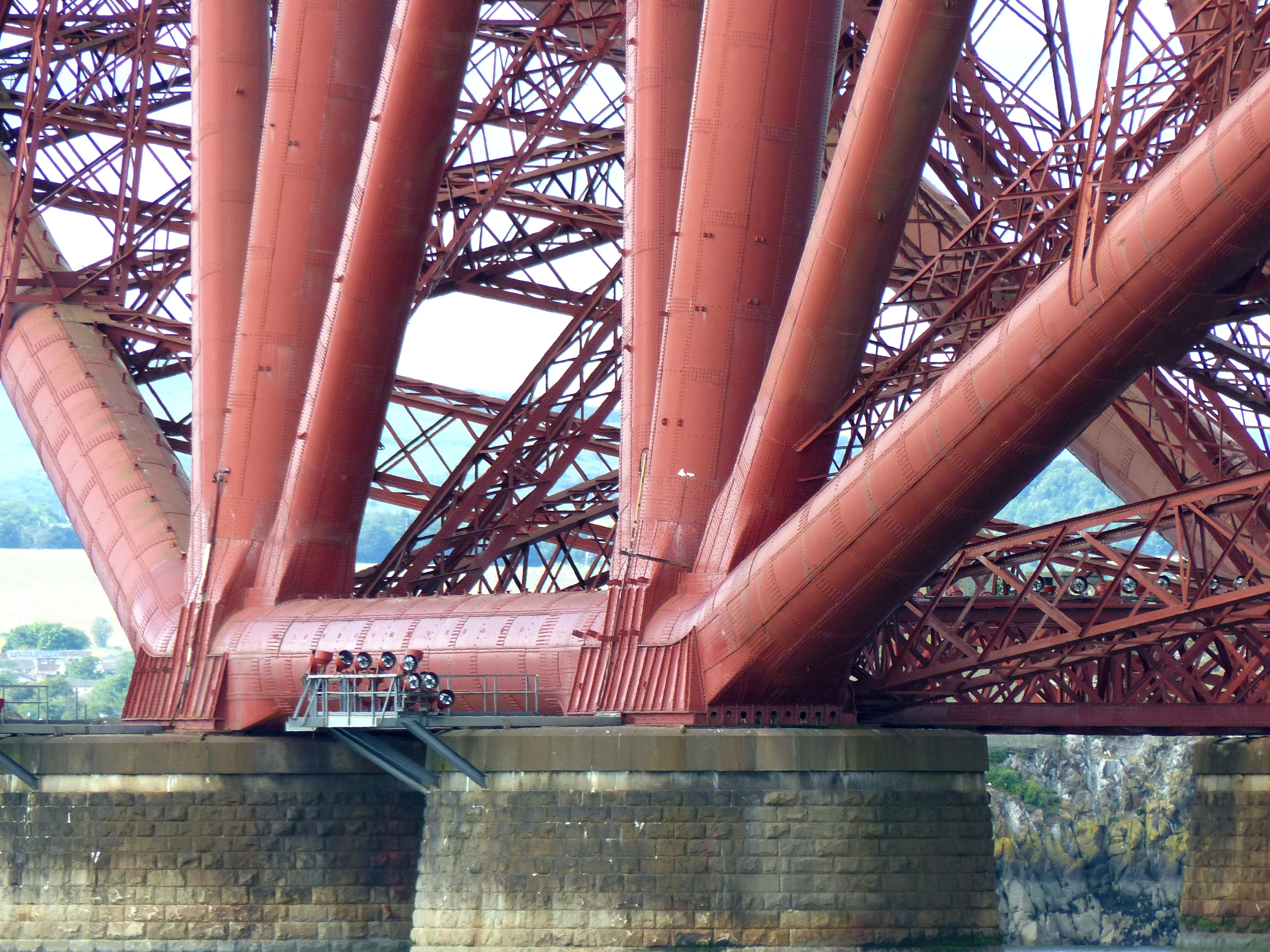
Close up on the base of one of the three double-cantilevers of the bridge

The three great four-tower cantilever structures are 361 feet (110.03 m) tall, each tower resting on a separate granite pier. These were constructed using 70 ft (21 m) diameter caissons; those for the north cantilever and two on the small uninhabited island of Inchgarvie acted as cofferdams, while the remaining two on Inchgarvie and those for the south cantilever, where the river bed was 91 ft (28 m) below high-water level, used compressed air to keep water out of the working chamber at the base.

=== Engineering principles ===
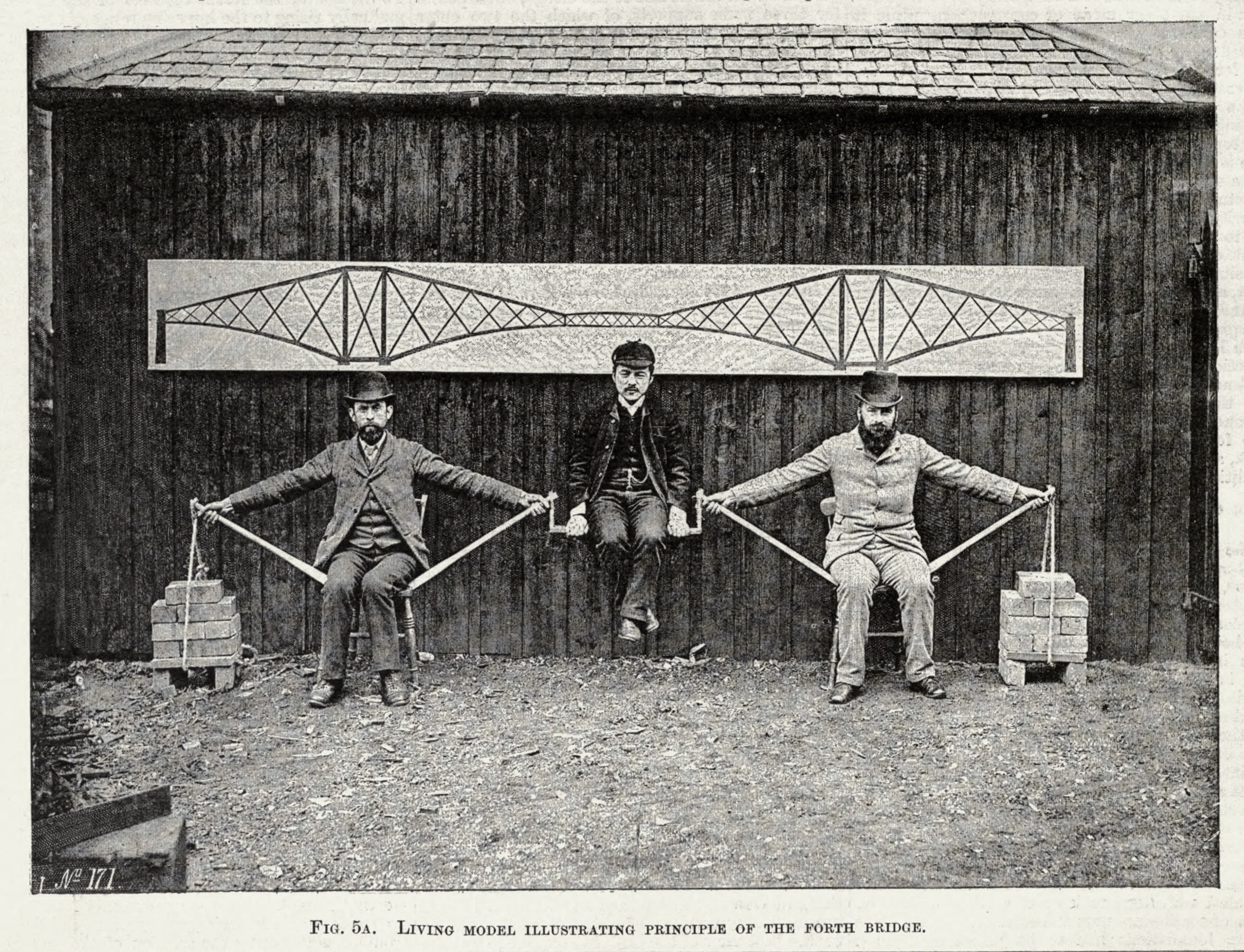
Illustration of the cantilever principle

The bridge is built on the principle of the cantilever bridge, where a cantilever beam supports a light central girder, a principle that has been used for thousands of years in the construction of bridges. In order to illustrate the use of tension and compression in the bridge, a demonstration in 1887 had the Japanese engineer Kaichi Watanabe supported between Fowler and Baker sitting in chairs. Fowler and Baker represent the cantilevers, with their arms in tension and the sticks under compression, and the bricks the cantilever end piers which are weighted with cast iron.

=== Materials ===
The bridge was the first major structure in Britain to be constructed of steel; its French contemporary, the Eiffel Tower, was built of wrought iron. Large amounts of steel became available after the invention of the Bessemer process, patented in 1856. In 1859, the Board of Trade imposed a limit of 77.22 N/mm^{2} (5 LTf/in^{2}) for the maximum design stress in railway bridges; this was revised as technology progressed.

The original design required 42,000 tonnes (41,000 long tons; 46,000 short tons) for the cantilevers only, of which 12,000 tonnes (12,000 long tons; 13,000 short tons) was to come from Siemens' steel works in Landore, Wales and the remainder from the Steel Company of Scotland's works near Glasgow. When modifications to the design necessitated a further 16,000 tonnes (16,000 long tons; 18,000 short tons), about half of this was supplied by the Steel Company of Scotland Ltd. and half by Dalzell's Iron and Steel Works in Motherwell. About 4,200 tonnes (4,100 long tons; 4,600 short tons) of rivets came from the Clyde Rivet Company of Glasgow. Around three or four thousand tons of steel was scrapped, some of which was used for temporary purposes, resulting in the discrepancy between the quantity delivered and the quantity erected.

=== Approaches ===
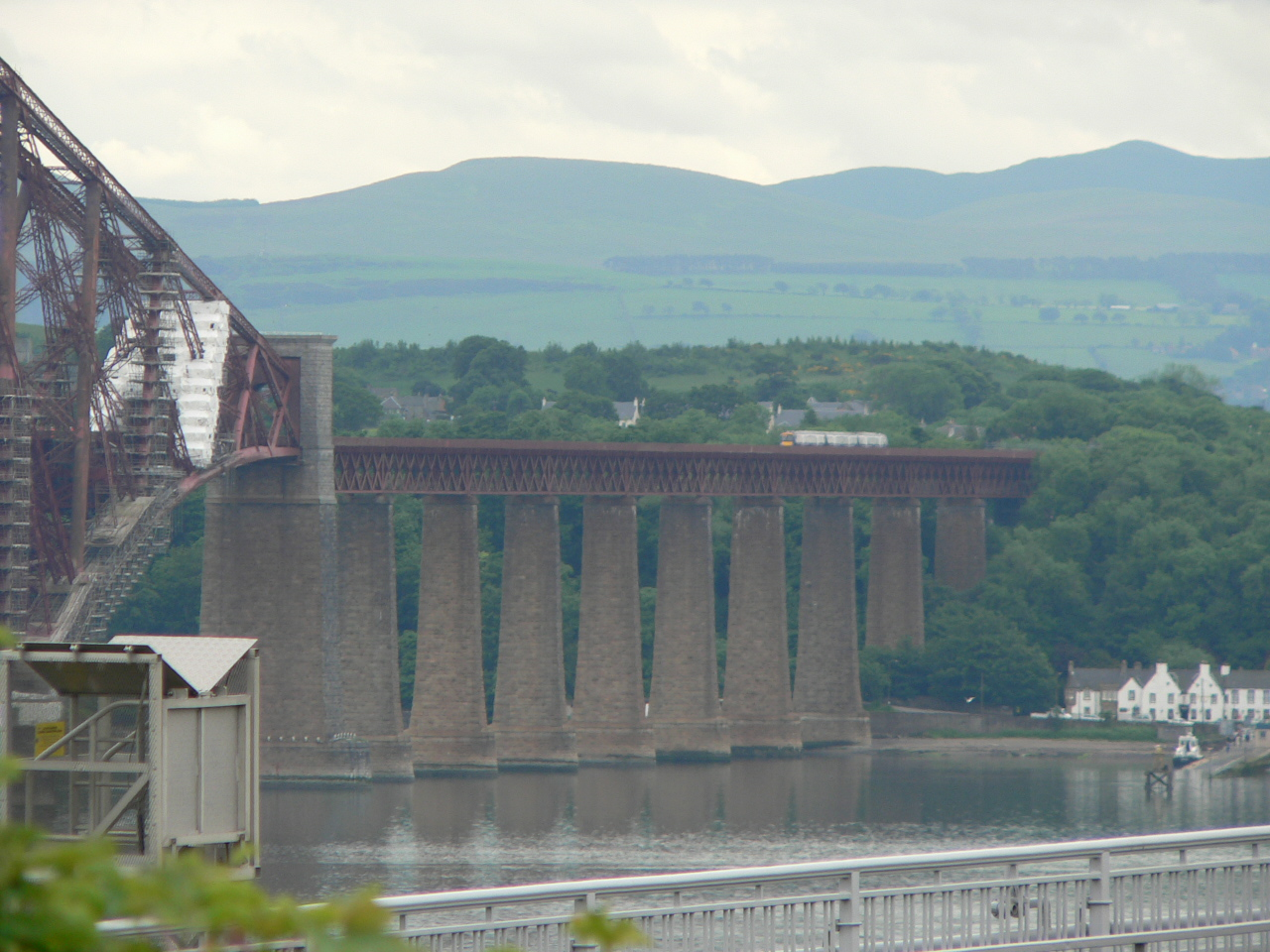
The southern approach to the Forth Bridge, designed by James Carswell

After Dalmeny railway station, the track curves slightly to the east before coming to the southern approach viaduct. After the railway crosses the bridge, it passes through North Queensferry railway station, before curving to the west, and then back to the east over the Jamestown Viaduct.

The approaches were built under separate contract and were to the design of the engineer James Carswell. The supports of the approach viaducts are tapered to prevent the impression of the columns widening as they approach the top, and an evaluation of the aesthetics of the Bridge in 2007, by A. D. Magee of the University of Bath, identified that order was present throughout, and this included in the approach viaducts. Magee points out that the masonry was carefully planned, and has neat block work even in areas not immediately visible from the ground.

== Construction ==
Forth Bridge Railway Act 1882
- Act of Parliament
- Parliament of the United Kingdom
- Long title: An Act to enable the Forth Bridge Railway Company to construct a substituted Railway across the Firth of Forth to amend the Acts relating to the Company and for other purposes.
- Citation: 45 & 46 Vict. c. cxiv

Dates
- Royal assent: 12 July 1882

Text of statute as originally enacted

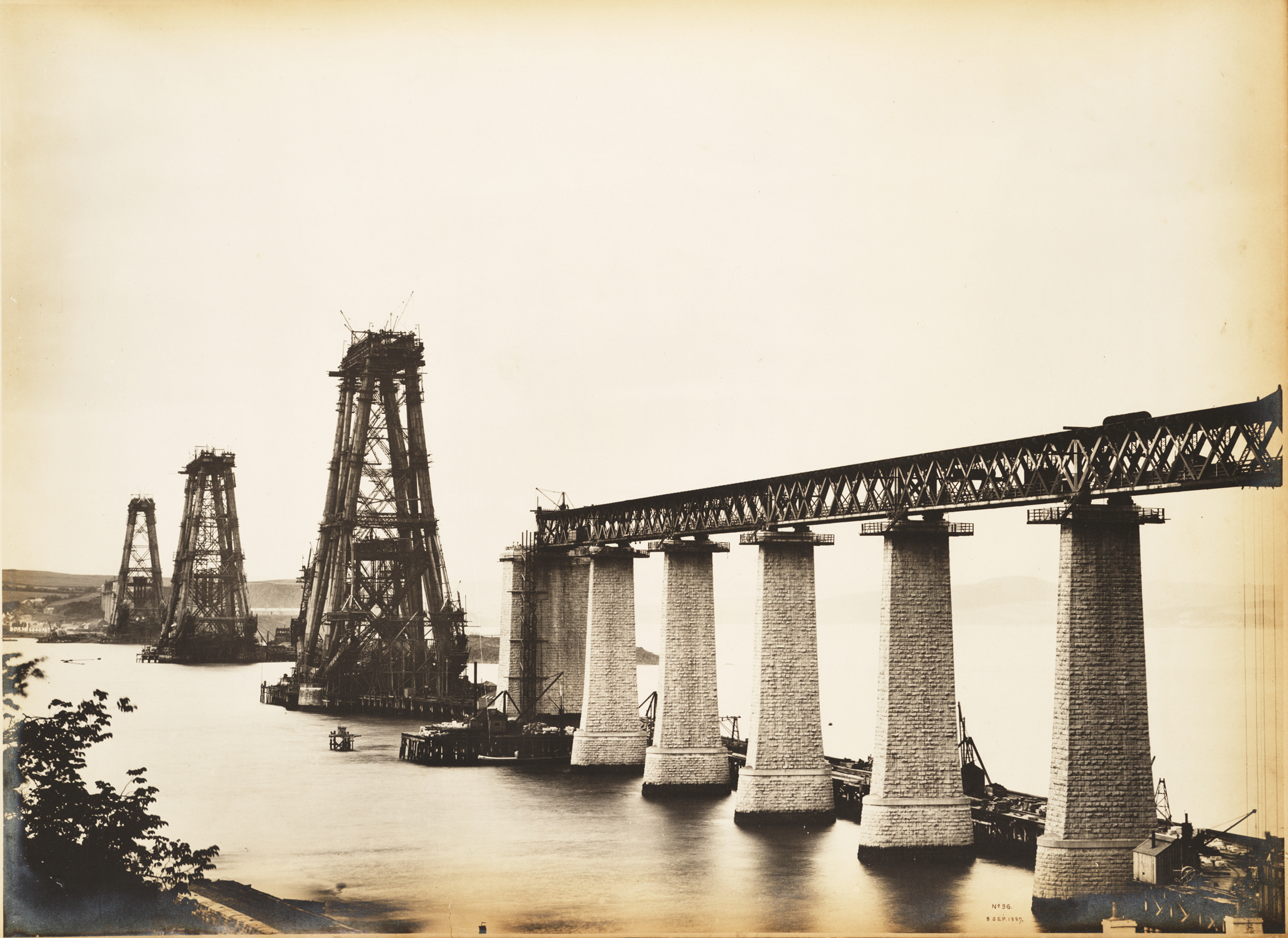
A view from South Queensferry of the bridge's cantilever towers being built in 1887.

The Forth Bridge Railway Act 1882 (45 & 46 Vict. c. cxiv) authorising the construction of the redesigned bridge was passed on 19 May 1882 after an eight-day enquiry, the only objections being from rival railway companies. On 21 December, the contract was let to Sir Thomas Tancred, T. H. Falkiner and Joseph Philips, civil engineers and contractor, and Sir William Arrol & Co. Arrol was a self-made man, who had been apprenticed to a blacksmith at the age of thirteen before going on to have a highly successful business. Tancred was a professional engineer who had worked with Arrol before, but he would leave the partnership during the course of construction.

=== Preparations ===
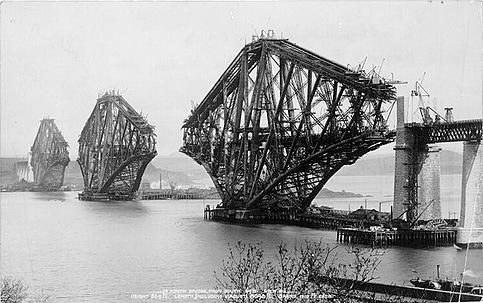
The cantilever towers are almost finished in 1888.

The new works took possession of offices and stores erected by Arrol in connection with Bouch's bridge; these were expanded considerably over time. Reginald Middleton took an accurate survey to establish the exact position of the bridge and allow the permanent construction work to commence.

The old coastguard station at the Fife end had to be removed to make way for the north-east pier. The rocky shore was levelled to a height of 7 feet (2.1 m) above high water to make way for plant and materials, and huts and other facilities for workmen were set up further inland.

The preparations at South Queensferry were much more substantial, and required the steep hillside to be terraced. Wooden huts and shops for the workmen were put up, as well as more substantial brick houses for the foremen and tenements for leading hands and gangers. Drill roads and workshops were built, as well as a drawing loft 200 by 60 feet (61 by 18 m) to allow full size drawings and templates to be laid out. A cable was also laid across the Forth to allow telephone communication between the centres at South Queensferry, Inchgarvie, and North Queensferry, and girders from the collapsed Tay Bridge were laid across the railway to the west in order to allow access to the ground there. Near the shore a sawmill and cement store were erected, and a substantial jetty around 2,100 feet (640 m) long was started early in 1883, and extended as necessary, and sidings were built to bring railway vehicles among the shops, and cranes set up to allow the loading and movement of material delivered by rail.

In April 1883, construction of a landing stage at Inchgarvie commenced. Extant buildings, including fortifications built in the 15th century, were roofed over to increase the available space, and the rock at the west of the island was cut down to a level seven feet (2.1 m) above high water, and a seawall was built to protect against large waves. In 1884 a compulsory purchase order was obtained for the island, as it was found that previously available area enclosed by the four piers of the bridge was insufficient for the storage of materials. Iron staging reinforced wood in heavily used areas was put up over the island, eventually covering around 10,000 square yards (8,400 m^{2}) and using over 1,000 tonnes (980 long tons; 1,100 short tons) of iron.

=== Movement of materials ===
The bridge uses 55,000 tonnes (54,000 long tons; 61,000 short tons) of steel and 140,000 cubic yards (110,000 m^{3}) of masonry. Many materials, including granite from Aberdeen, Arbroath rubble, sand, timber, and sometimes coke and coal, could be taken straight to the centre where they were required. Steel was delivered by train and prepared at the yard at South Queensferry, painted with boiled linseed oil, and was then taken to where it was needed by barge. The cement used was Portland cement manufactured on the Medway. It required to be stored before it was able to be used, and up to 1,200 tonnes (1,200 long tons; 1,300 short tons) of cement could be kept in a barge, formerly called the Hougoumont that was moored off South Queensferry.

For a time a paddle steamer was hired for the movement of workers, but after a time it was replaced with one capable of carrying 450 men, and the barges were also used for carrying people. Special trains were run from Edinburgh and Dunfermline, and a steamer ran to Leith in the summer.

=== Circular piers ===
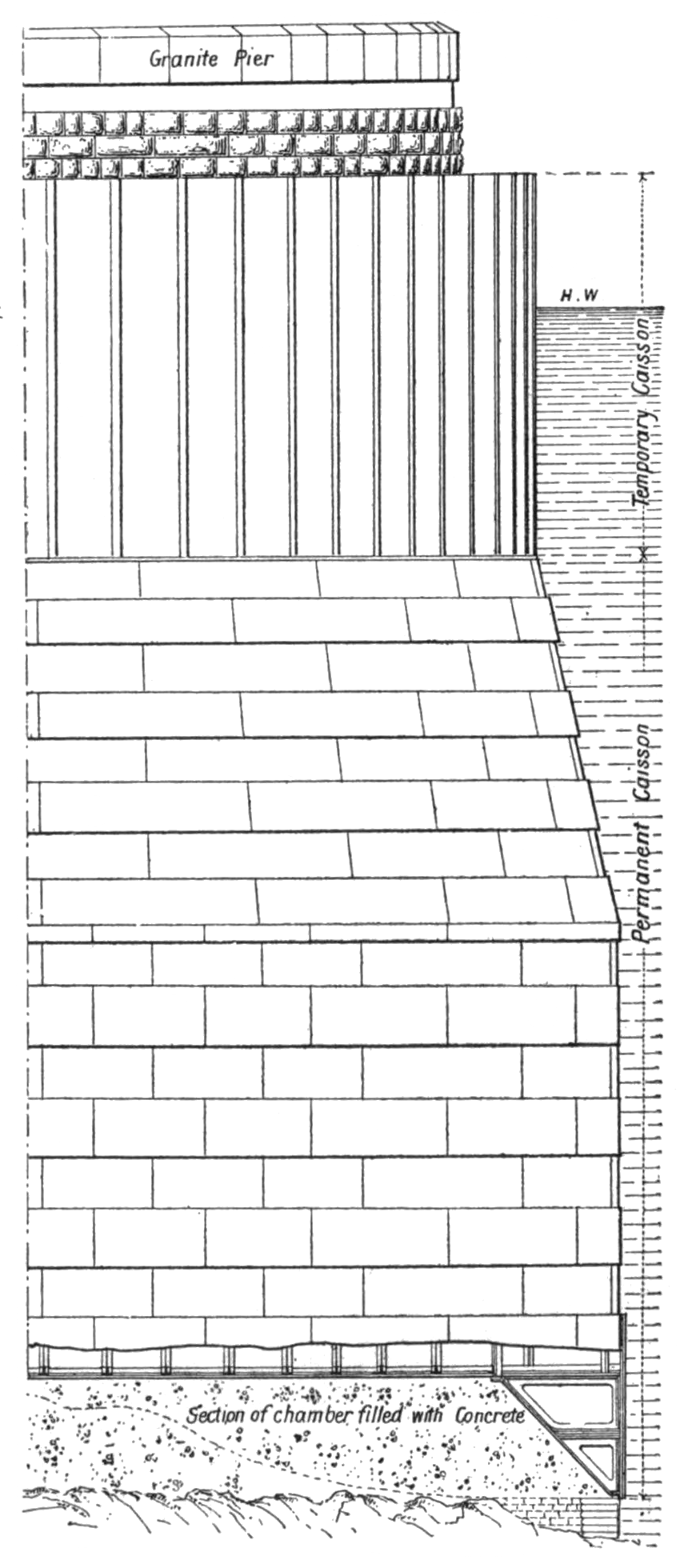
A completed caisson on Inchgarvie with the granite pier

The three towers of the cantilever are each seated on four circular piers. Since the foundations were required to be constructed at or below sea level, they were excavated with the assistance of caissons and cofferdams. Caissons were used at locations that were either always under water, even at low tide, or where the foundations were to be built on mud and clay. Cofferdams were used where rock was nearer to the surface, and it was possible to work in low tide.

Six caissons were excavated by the pneumatic process, by the French contractor L. Coisea. This process used a positive air pressure inside a sealed caisson to allow dry working conditions at depths of up to 89 feet (27 m).

These caissons were constructed and assembled in Glasgow by the Arrol Brothers, namesakes of but unconnected to W. Arrol, before being dismantled and transported to South Queensferry. The caissons were then built up to a large extent before being floated to their final resting-places. The first caisson, for the south-west pier at South Queensferry was launched on 26 May 1884, and the last caisson was launched on 29 May 1885 for the south-west pier at Inchgarvie. When the caissons had been launched and moored, they were extended upwards with a temporary portion in order to keep water out and allow the granite pier to be built when in place.

Above the foundations each of which is different to suit the different sites, is a tapered circular granite pier with a diameter of 55 feet (17 m) at the bottom and a height of 36 feet (11 m).

==== Inchgarvie ====
The rock on which the two northern piers at Inchgarvie are located is submerged at high water, and of the other two piers, the site of the eastern one is about half submerged and the western one was three-quarters submerged. This meant work initially had to be done at low tide.

The southern piers on Inchgarvie are sited on solid rock with a slope of around 1 in 5, so the rock was prepared with concrete and sandbags to make a landing-spot for the caissons. Excavation was carried out by drilling and blasting, but no blasting was done within 1.5 ft (0.46 m) of the caissons, and the remaining rock was quarried to within 6 in (150 mm).

==== North Queensferry ====
Once the positions of the piers had been established, the first task at the Fife end was to level the site of the northernmost piers, a bedrock of whinstone rising to a level of 10 to 20 feet (3.0 to 6.1 m) above high water, to a height of 7 feet (2.1 m) above high water. The south piers at North Queensferry are sited on rock sloping into the sea, and the site was prepared by diamond drilling holes for explosive charges and blasting the rock.

==== South Queensferry ====
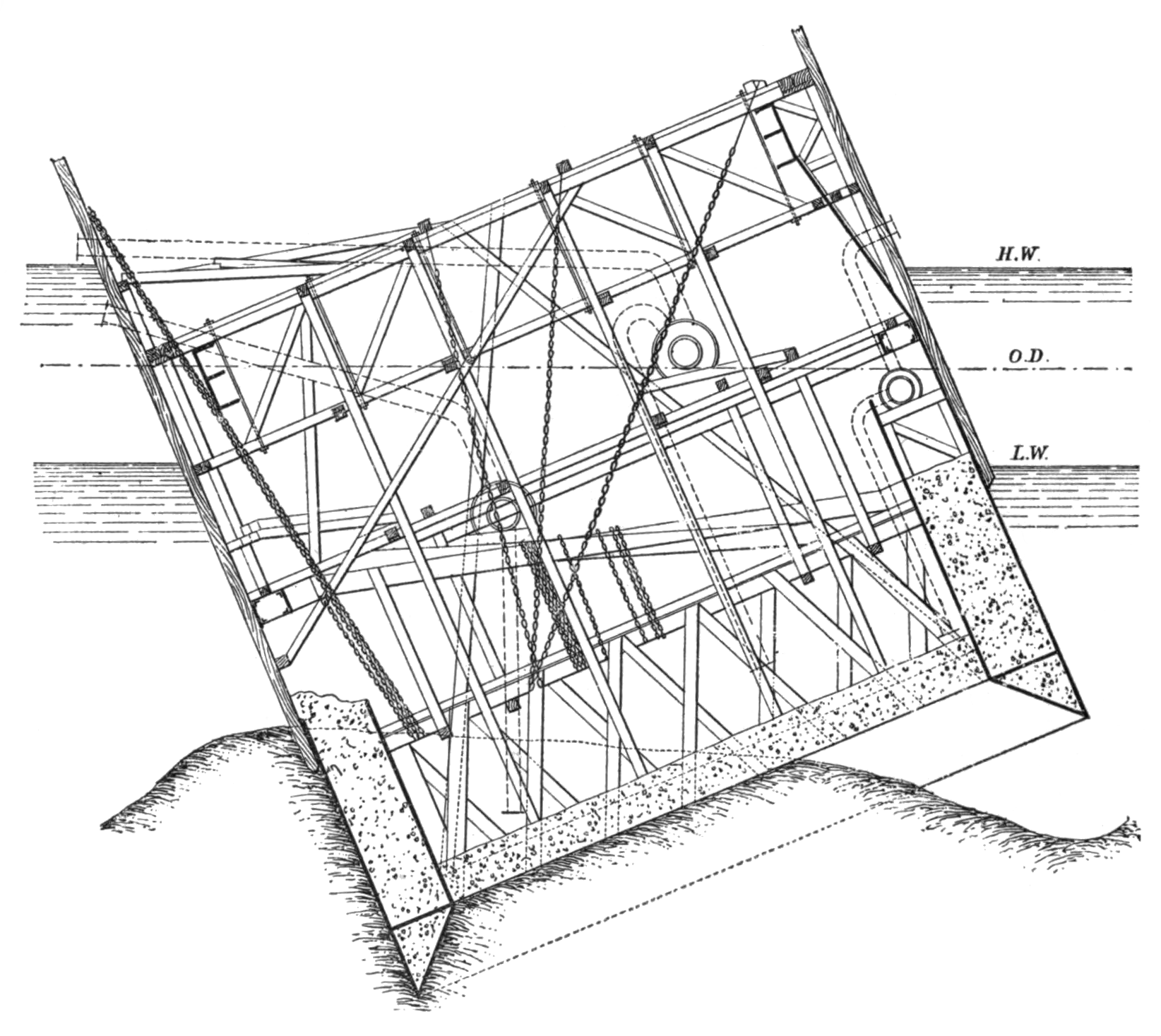
The tilted caisson

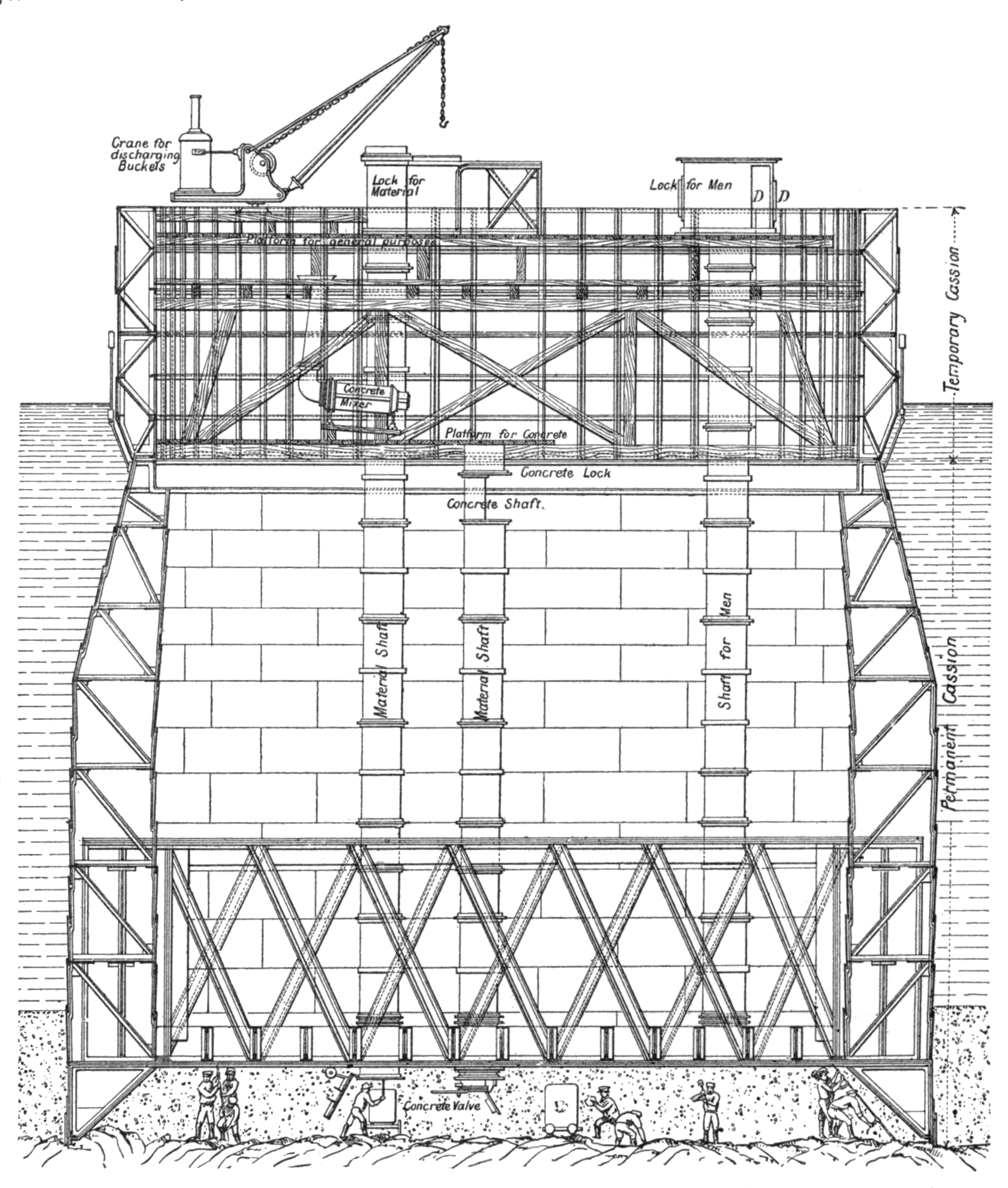
The mode of sinking the South Queensferry caissons

The four South Queensferry caissons were all sunk by the pneumatic method, and are identical in design except for differences in height. A T shaped jetty was built at the site of the South Queensferry piers, to allow one caisson to be attached to each corner, and when launched the caissons were attached to the jetty and permitted to rise and fall with the tide. Excavation beneath the caissons was generally only carried out at high tide when the caisson was supported by buoyancy, and then when the tide fell the air pressure was reduced in order to allow the caisson to sink down, and digging would begin anew.

The north-west caisson was towed into place in December 1884, but an exceptionally low tide on New Year's Day 1885 caused the caisson to sink into the mud of the river bed and adopt a slight tilt. When the tide rose, it flooded over the lower edge, filling the caisson with water, and when the tide fell but the water did not drain from the caisson, its top-heaviness caused to tilt further. Plates were bolted on by divers to raise the edge of the caisson above water level, and the caisson was reinforced with wooden struts as water was pumped out, but pumping took place too quickly and the water pressure tore a hole between 25 and 30 feet (7.6 and 9.1 m) long. It was decided to construct a "barrel" of large timbers inside the caisson to reinforce it, and it was ten months before the caisson could be pumped out and dug free. The caisson was refloated on 19 October 1885, and then moved into position and sunk with suitable modifications.

=== Approach viaducts ===
The approach viaducts to the north and south had to be carried at 130 feet 6 inches (39.78 m) above the level of high water, and it was decided to build them at a lower level and then raise them in tandem with the construction of the masonry piers. The two viaducts have fifteen spans between them, each one 168 feet (51 m) long and weighing slightly over 200 tonnes (200 long tons; 220 short tons). Two spans are attached together to make a continuous girder, with an expansion joint between each pair of spans. Due to the slope of the hill under the viaducts, the girders were assembled at different heights, and only joined when they had reached the same level. Lifting was done using large hydraulic rams, and took place in increments of around 3 feet 6 inches (1.07 m) every four days.

=== Building the cantilevers ===
The tubular members were constructed in the No. 2 workshop further up the hill at South Queensferry. To bend plates into the required shape, they were first heated in a gas furnace, and then pressed into the correct curve. The curved plates were then assembled on a mandrel, and holes drilled for rivets, before they were marked individually and moved to the correct location to be added to the structure. Lattice members and other parts were also assembled at South Queensferry, using cranes and highly efficient hydraulic rivetters.

=== Opening ===
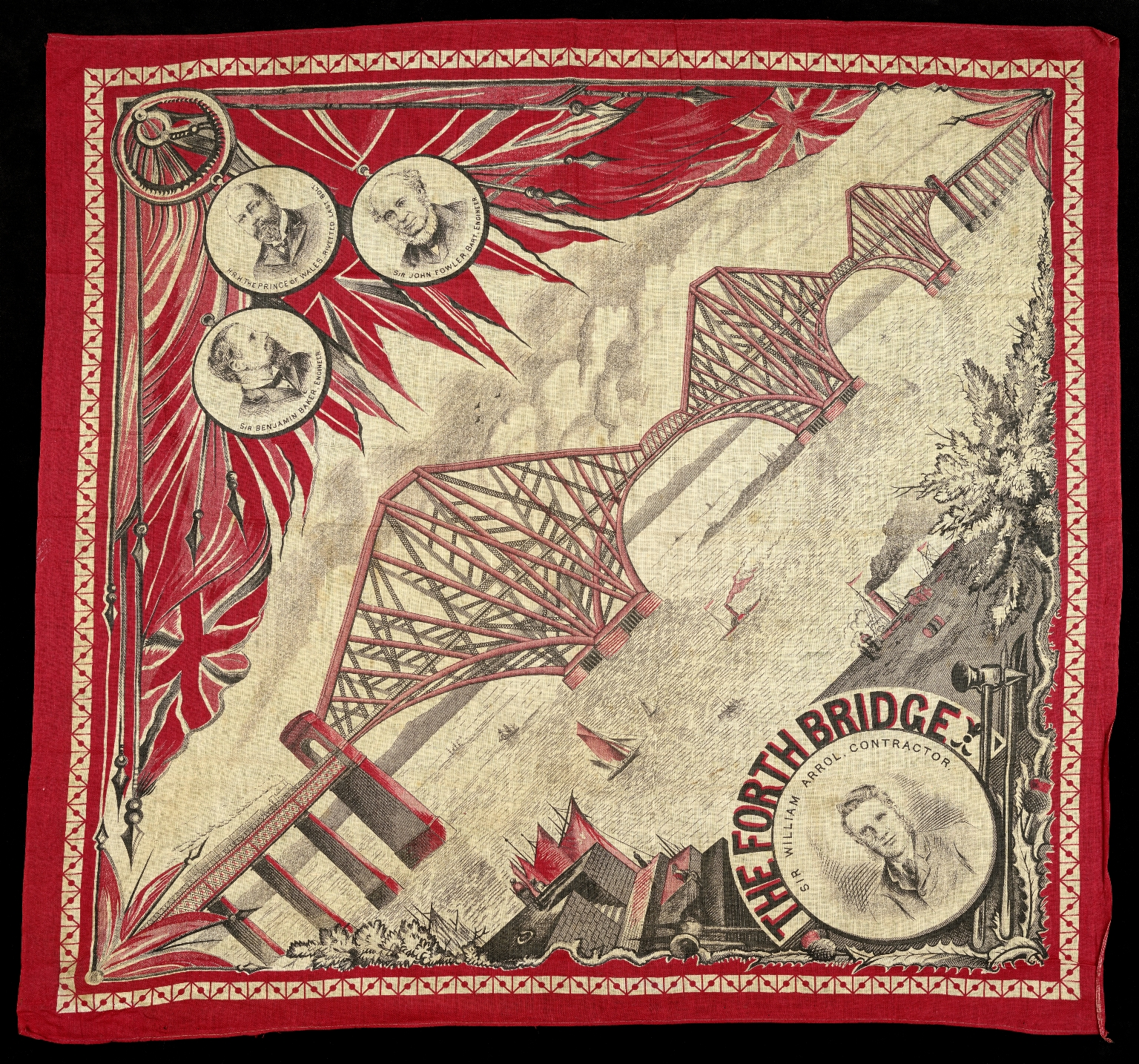
The Forth bridge kerchief commemorating its opening printed in red and black with a picture of the bridge, celebratory swagged union flags

The bridge was completed in December 1889, and load testing of the completed bridge was carried out on 21 January 1890. Two trains, each consisting of three heavy locomotives and 50 wagons loaded with coal, totalling 1,880 tons in weight, were driven slowly from South Queensferry to the middle of the north cantilever, stopping frequently to measure the deflection of the bridge. This represented more than twice the design load of the bridge: the deflection under load was as expected. A few days previously there had been a violent storm, producing the highest wind pressure recorded to date at Inchgarvie, and the deflection of the cantilevers had been less than 25 mm (1 in). The first complete crossing took place on 24 February, when a train consisting of two carriages carrying the chairmen of the railway companies involved made several crossings. The bridge was opened on 4 March 1890 by the Duke of Rothesay, later King Edward VII, who drove home the last rivet, which was gold plated and suitably inscribed. The key for the official opening was made by Edinburgh silversmith John Finlayson Bain, commemorated in a plaque on the bridge. When it opened it had the longest single cantilever bridge span in the world, until 1919 when the Quebec Bridge in Canada was completed. It continues to be the world's second-longest single cantilever span, with a span of 1,709 feet (521 m).

To make the fullest use of the bridge, several new railway connections were built, bringing main line routes to the bridge. The construction of some of these lines was only completed on 2 June 1890, delaying the implementation of a full express train service over the bridge until that date. Even then, there was considerable congestion at Edinburgh Waverley station with remarshalling of the portions of the new, more intensive train service.

=== Accidents and deaths ===
At its peak, approximately 4,600 workers were employed in the bridge's construction. Wilhelm Westhofen recorded in 1890 that 57 people died. In 2005 the Forth Bridge Memorial Committee was set up to erect a monument to those lost, and a team of local historians set out to name all those who died. As of 2009, 73 deaths have been connected with the construction of the bridge and its immediate aftermath. It is thought that the figure of 57 deaths excluded those who died working on the approaches to the bridge, as those parts were completed by a subcontractor, as well as those who died after the Sick and Accident Club stopped. Of the 73 recorded deaths, 38 were as a result of falling, 9 of being crushed, 9 drowned, 8 struck by a falling object, 3 died in a fire in a bothy, 1 of caisson disease, and the cause of five deaths is unknown.

The Sick and Accident Club was founded in 1883, and membership was compulsory for all contractors' employees. It would provide medical treatment to men and sometimes their families, and pay them if they were unable to work. The club also paid for funerals within certain limits, and would provide grants to the widows of men killed or the wives of those permanently disabled. Eight men were saved from drowning by rowing boats positioned in the river under the working areas.

In 2019, it was reported that historians of the Queensferry Historian Group had discovered that at least 21 more men died building the Forth Bridge than was previously thought, in an alleged "cover up" of the true human cost of the structure, taking the new death toll to 78. Tragically, this arguably makes the Forth Bridge a more deadly structure than the failed Tay Bridge when counting both the 59 known deaths attributed to the Tay Bridge Disaster, that led to the earlier proposal for the Forth Bridge construction being halted and subsequently redesigned, combined with the 14 deaths during its construction.

== Later history ==
=== Race to the North ===
Before the opening of the Forth Bridge, the railway journey from London to Aberdeen had taken about 13 hours running from Euston and using the London and North Western Railway and Caledonian Railway on a west coast route. With competition opened along the east coast route from the Great Northern, North Eastern and North British railways and starting from King's Cross, unofficial racing took place between the two consortia, reducing the journey time to about 8 1/2 hours on the overnight runs. This reached a climax in 1895 with sensational daily press reports about the "Race to the North". When race fever subsided the journey times became around 10 1/2 hours.

=== World wars ===
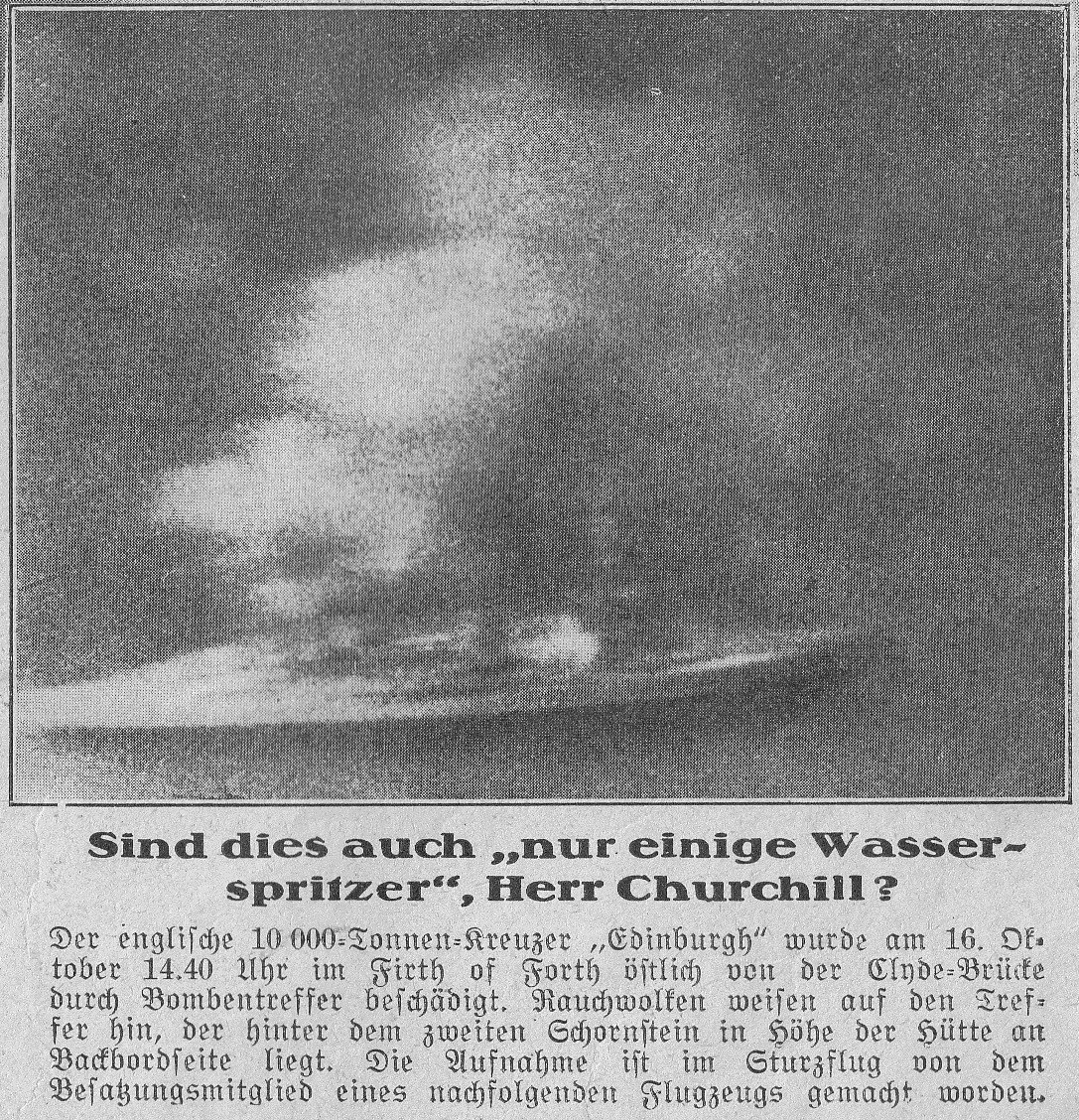
A German photograph allegedly taken during the raid

In the First World War British sailors would time their departures or returns to the base at Rosyth by asking when they would pass under the bridge. The first German air attack on Britain in the Second World War took place over the Forth Bridge, six weeks into the war, on 16 October 1939. Although known as the "Forth Bridge Raid", the bridge was not the target and not damaged. In all, 12 German Junkers Ju 88 bombers led by two reconnaissance Heinkel He 111s from Westerland on the island of Sylt, 460 miles (400 nmi; 740 km) away, reached the Scottish coast in four waves of three. The target of the attack was shipping from the Rosyth naval base in the Forth, about 2 miles (3.2 km) to the west of the bridge. The Germans were hoping to find HMS Hood, the largest capital ship in the Royal Navy. Luftwaffe rules of engagement restricted action to targets on water and not in the dockyard. Although HMS Repulse was in Rosyth, the attack was concentrated on the cruisers Edinburgh and Southampton, the carrier Furious and the destroyer Jervis. The destroyer Mohawk and the cruisers, Southampton and Edinburgh were damaged. Sixteen Royal Navy crew died and 44 were wounded, although this information was not made public at the time.

Spitfires from 603 "City of Edinburgh" Squadron RAF intercepted the raiders and during the attack shot down the first German aircraft downed over Britain in the war. One bomber came down in the water off Port Seton on the East Lothian coast and another off Crail on the coast of Fife. After the War it was learned that a third bomber had come down in the Netherlands as a result of damage inflicted during the raid. Later in the month, a reconnaissance Heinkel 111 crashed near Humbie in East Lothian and photographs of this crashed plane were, and still are, used erroneously to illustrate the raid of 16 October, thus sowing confusion as to whether a third aircraft had been brought down. Members of the bomber crew at Port Seton were rescued and made prisoners-of-war. Two bodies were recovered from the Crail wreckage and after a full military funeral with firing party, were interred in Portobello cemetery, Edinburgh. The body of the gunner was never found. A wartime propaganda film, Squadron 992, made by the GPO Film Unit after the raid, recreated it and conveyed the false impression that the main target was the bridge.

=== Ownership ===
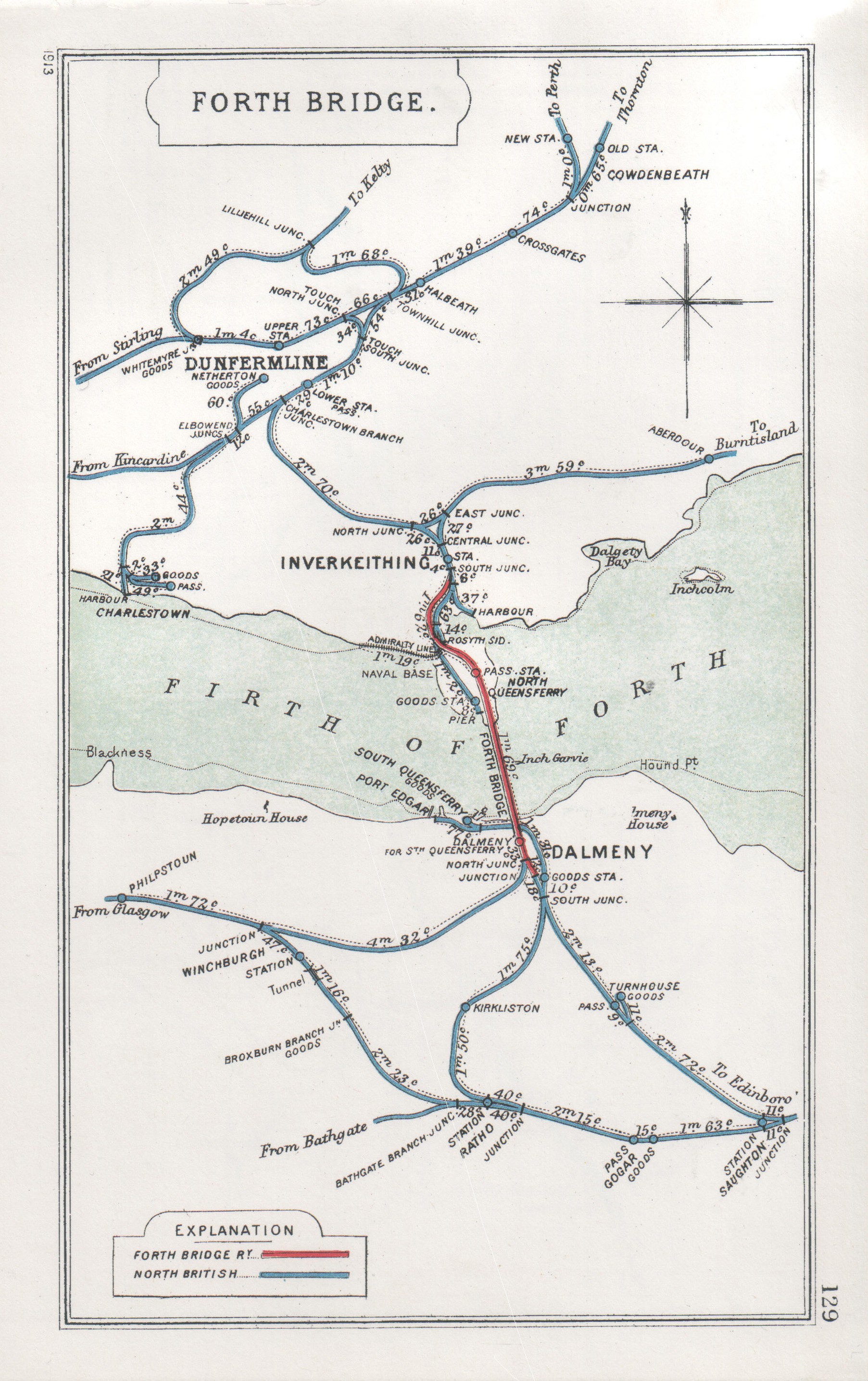
A 1913 Railway Clearing House Junction Diagram showing the Forth Bridge Railway (red) and neighbouring lines of the North British Railway (blue)

Before the opening of the bridge, the North British Railway (NBR) had lines on both sides of the Firth of Forth between which trains could not pass except by running at least as far west as Alloa and using the lines of a rival company. The only alternative route between Edinburgh and Fife involved the ferry at Queensferry, which was purchased by the NBR in 1867. Accordingly, the NBR sponsored the Forth Bridge project which would give them a direct link independent of the Caledonian Railway. A conference at York in 1881 set up the Forth Bridge Railway Committee, to which the NBR contributed 35% of the cost. The remaining money came from three English railways, which ran trains from London over NBR tracks. The Midland Railway, which connected to the NBR at Carlisle and which owned the route to London St Pancras, contributed 30%, and 17.5% came equally from each of the North Eastern Railway and the Great Northern Railway, which between them owned the route between Berwick-upon-Tweed and London King's Cross, via Doncaster. This body undertook to construct and maintain the bridge.

In 1882 the NBR were given powers to purchase the bridge, which it never exercised. At the time of the 1923 Grouping, the bridge was still jointly owned by the same four railways, and so it became jointly owned by these companies' successors, the London Midland and Scottish Railway (30%) and the London and North Eastern Railway (70%). The Forth Bridge Railway Company was named in the Transport Act 1947 as one of the bodies to be nationalised and so became part of British Railways on 1 January 1948. Under the act, Forth Bridge shareholders would receive £109 of British Transport stock for each £100 of Forth Bridge Debenture stock; and £104 17s 6d of British Transport stock for each £100 of Forth Bridge Ordinary stock.

As of April 2017, the bridge and its associated railway infrastructure were owned by Network Rail Infrastructure Limited.

== Operation ==
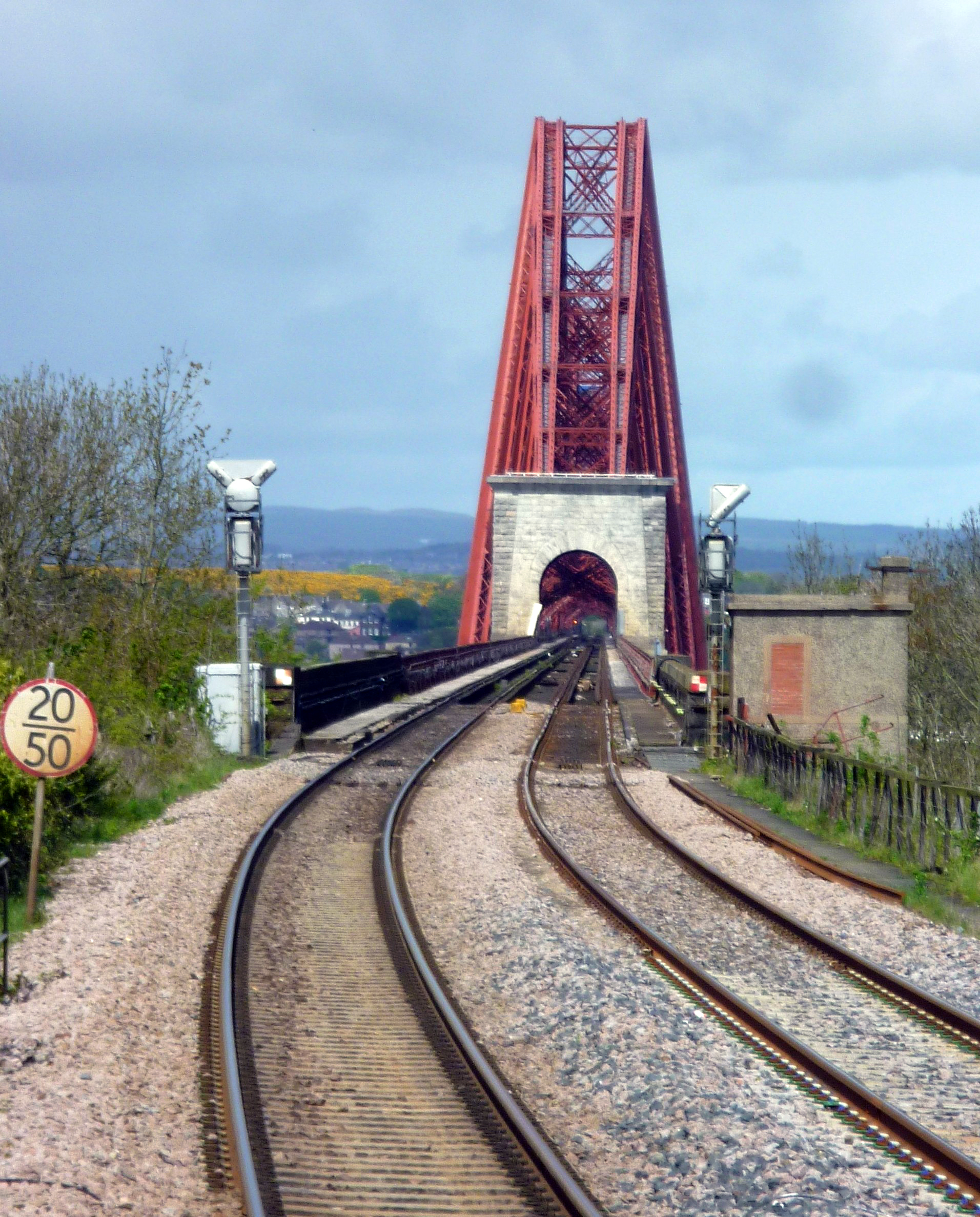
The approach to the bridge from Dalmeny Station

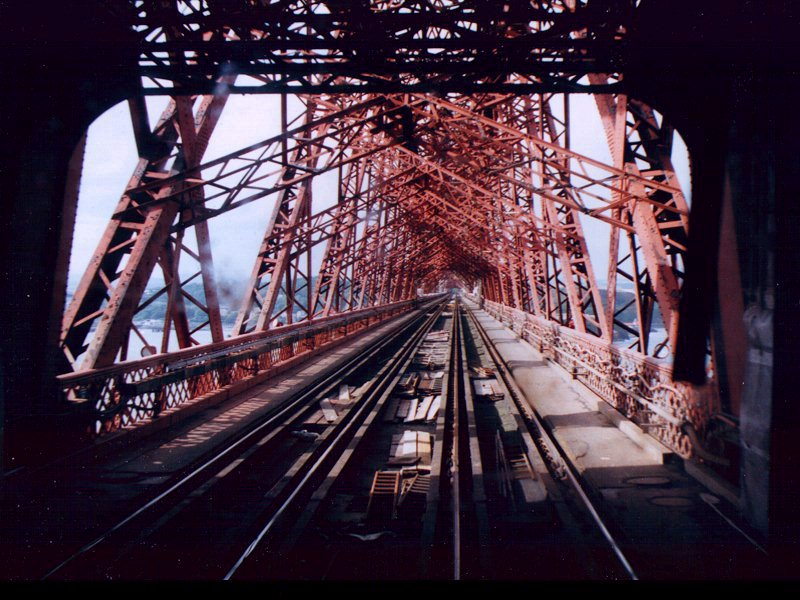
Inside the Forth Bridge as seen from a ScotRail Class 158

=== Traffic ===
The bridge has a speed limit of 50 miles per hour (80 km/h) for high-speed trains and diesel multiple units, 40 miles per hour (64 km/h) for ordinary passenger trains and 30 miles per hour (48 km/h) for freight trains. The route availability code is RA8, but freight trains above a certain size must not pass each other on the bridge. Up to 190–200 trains per day crossed the bridge in 2006.

=== Maintenance ===
"Painting the Forth Bridge" is a colloquial expression for a never-ending task, coined on the erroneous belief that at one time in the history of the bridge repainting was required and commenced immediately upon completion of the previous repaint. Such a practice never existed, as weathered areas were given more attention, but there was a permanent maintenance crew. Between 2001 and 2011, the bridge was covered in a new coating designed to last for 25 years, bringing an end to having painters as a regular part of the maintenance crew. Colin Hardie, of Balfour Beatty Construction, was reported as saying,

For the first time in the bridge's history there will be no painters required on the bridge. Job done ...

— Colin Hardie, BBC News article, 5 September 2011

=== Restoration ===
Floodlighting was installed in 1990, and the track was renewed between 1992 and 1995. The bridge was costing British Rail £1 million a year to maintain, and they announced that the schedule of painting would be interrupted to save money, and the following year, upon privatisation, Railtrack took over. A £40 million package of works commenced in 1998, and in 2002 the responsibility of the bridge was passed to Network Rail.

Work started in 2002 to repaint the bridge fully for the first time in its history, in a £130 million contract awarded to Balfour Beatty. Up to 4,000 tonnes (3,900 long tons; 4,400 short tons) of scaffolding was on the bridge at any time, and computer modelling was used to analyse the additional wind load on the structure. The bridge was encapsulated in a climate controlled membrane to give the proper conditions for the application of the paint. All previous layers of paint were removed using copper slag fired at up to 200 miles per hour (320 km/h), exposing the steel and allowing repairs to be made. The paint, developed specifically for the bridge by Leigh Paints, consisted of a system of three coats derived from that used in the North Sea oil industry; a total of 240,000 litres (53,000 imp gal; 63,000 US gal) was applied to 255,000 square metres (2,740,000 sq ft) of the structure, and it is not expected to need repainting for at least 20 years. The top coat can be reapplied indefinitely, minimising future maintenance work.

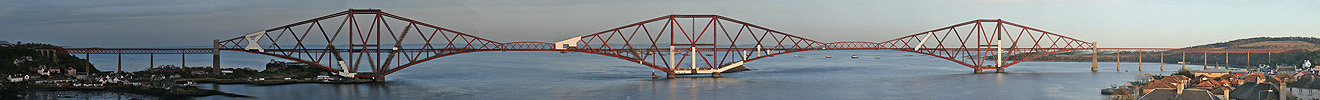
Panoramic view of the Forth Bridge undergoing maintenance work in 2007

In a report produced by J. E. Jacobs, Grant Thornton and Faber Maunsell in 2007 which reviewed the alternative options for a second road crossing, it was stated that "Network Rail has estimated the [remaining] life of the bridge to be in excess of 100 years. However, this is dependant [sic] upon NR's inspection and refurbishment works programme for the bridge being carried out year on year".

== In culture ==
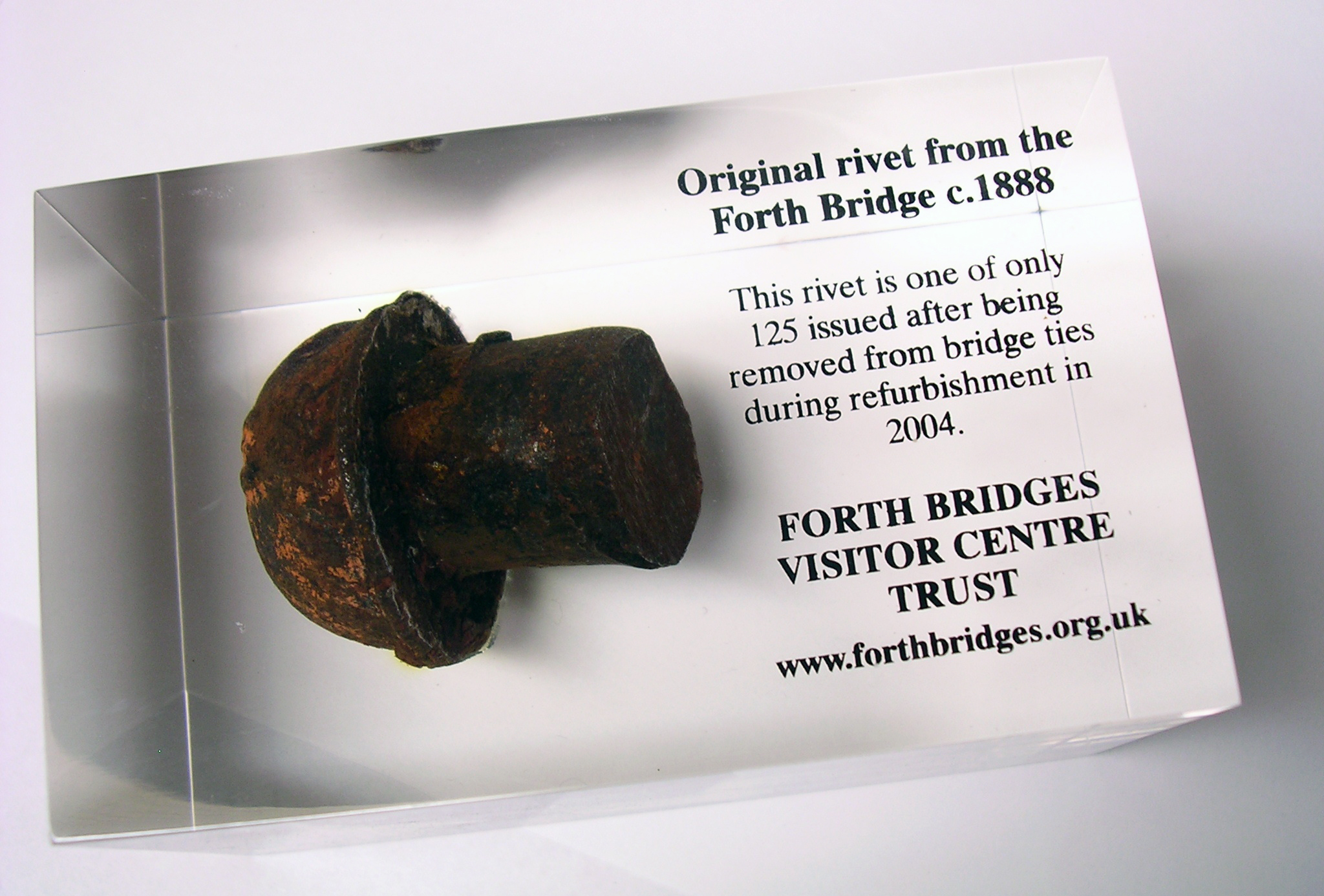
Original rivet from the Forth Bridge

=== In the media ===
The Forth Bridge has been featured in television programmes and films, including Carry On Regardless, Alfred Hitchcock's 1935 film The 39 Steps, and its 1959 remake. A.G. Barr used the bridge in posters advertising its soft drink Irn-Bru, with the slogan: "Made in Scotland, from girders". In 2005, the BBC lit the Bridge in red for Comic Relief. Also in 2005, Channel 4 documentary Jump Britain showed Sébastien Foucan, a French freerunner, crawling along one of the highest points of the bridge without a harness. The first episode of the UK television series Britain's Greatest Bridges featured the Forth Bridge and was aired on Spike UK on 12 January 2017.

=== In general culture ===
The location of the Forth Bridge has seen it featured in other cultural forms. In the build up to the Millennium celebrations a countdown clock sponsored by the Royal Bank of Scotland was attached to the top of the Bridge in 1998. Iain Banks wrote the novel The Bridge, which is mainly set on a fictionalised version of the bridge, which links "The City" (Edinburgh) and "The Kingdom" (Fife). In Alan Turing's most famous paper about artificial intelligence, one of the challenges put to the subject of an imagined Turing test is "Please write me a sonnet on the subject of the Forth Bridge." The test subject in Turing's paper answers, "Count me out on this one. I never could write poetry." The bridge is included in the video game Grand Theft Auto: San Andreas by Edinburgh-based developer Rockstar North. Renamed the Kincaid Bridge, it serves as the main railway bridge of the fictional city of San Fierro, and appears alongside a virtual Forth Road Bridge.

D'Arcy Thompson used a figure of a bison skeleton when comparing it to the structural form of the Forth Bridge.

In his 1917 book On Growth and Form, the mathematical biologist D'Arcy Thompson compares the structural form of the Forth Bridge with the cantilevered skeleton of an ox, the piers corresponding to legs, the cantilevers to the vertebral column:

In a typical cantilever bridge, such as the Forth Bridge, a certain simplification is introduced. For each pier carries, in this case, its own double-armed cantilever, linked by a short connecting girder to the next, but so jointed to it that no weight is transmitted from one cantilever to another. The bridge in short is cut into separate sections, practically independent of one another ... In the horse or the ox, it is obvious that the two piers of the bridge, that is to say the fore-legs and the hind-legs, do not bear (as they do in the Forth Bridge) separate and independent loads, but the whole system forms a continuous structure.

=== As heritage ===
A comparison of the side elevation of the Forth Bridge to the side elevations of some of the most notable bridges around the world on the same scale (see also interactive version)

UNESCO inscribed the bridge as a World Heritage Site on 5 July 2015, recognising it as "an extraordinary and impressive milestone in bridge design and construction during the period when railways came to dominate long-distance land travel". It is the sixth World Heritage Site to be inscribed in Scotland. In 2016, a VisitScotland survey voted the Forth Bridge "Scotland's greatest man-made wonder", beating off competition from Stirling Castle, the Caledonian Canal, the Scott Monument, Bell Rock Lighthouse, and Melrose Abbey.

The Forth Bridge has appeared in representation on a 2004 one pound coin, issued by the Royal Mint. The Bridge has also featured on banknotes including the 2007 series issued by the Bank of Scotland, which depicts different bridges in Scotland as examples of Scottish engineering, and the £20 note features the Forth Bridge. In 2014 Clydesdale Bank announced the introduction of Britain's second polymer banknote, a £5 note featuring Sir William Arrol and the Forth Bridge (the first polymer banknote was issued by Northern Bank in 2000). It was introduced in 2015 to commemorate the 125th anniversary of the opening of the bridge, and its nomination to become a UNESCO World Heritage Site.

"Operation Forth Bridge" was the title of the plans for the funeral of Prince Philip, Duke of Edinburgh in 2021.

=== Visitor attraction ===
View of the platform on the top of the north cantilever of the Forth Bridge looking over North Queensferry

Network Rail plans to add a visitor centre to the bridge, which would include a viewing platform on top of the North Queensferry side, or a bridge climbing experience to the South Queensferry side. In December 2014 it was announced Arup had been awarded the design contract for the project. In September 2019, Network Rail submitted plans to build a visitor centre at the South Queensferry side that would serve as a base for the bridge climbing experience, dubbed "The Forth Bridge Experience". The plans were approved in early 2020 but were put on hold due to the COVID-19 pandemic. Revised plans were submitted in February 2022.

Since 2020 Barnardo's have run Your View at the Forth Bridge which allows visitors to pay money to the charity and experience 20/25 minutes at the platform at the top of the north cantilever

== See also ==
- Banknotes of Scotland (featured on design)
- List of bridges in Scotland
