= Forth Bridge approach railways =

Railway lines in Scotland

The Forth Bridge approach railways were railway lines constructed in the period 1887 to 1890 to form new main lines on the opening of the Forth Bridge at the Queensferry crossing. Until then, only local branch lines approached the location. The North British Railway built new main lines and upgraded some existing lines.

The increase in passenger traffic resulted in serious congestion at Edinburgh Waverley, which was extended and modernised in the years following 1890.

== Background ==
In 1842 the Edinburgh and Glasgow Railway opened its main line. It was an immediate success, showing that longer distance railways could be commercially viable. The easy availability of money in the following years resulted in a considerable number of Scottish railway schemes being promoted, and many were authorised in the 1845 Parliamentary session. Among them were railways aspiring to reach northwards from the central belt.

The Scottish Central Railway obtained authorisation to build from the Edinburgh and Glasgow line near Castlecary, to Perth by way of Stirling. The SCR opened in 1848, and in time connected with other railways north and east of Perth.

The Edinburgh and Northern Railway was authorised on the same day in 1845 as the SCR; its line was to run from Burntisland, in Fife on the northern shore of the Firth of Forth, and to reach both Perth and Dundee by an inland route. In fact Dundee was to be reached by ferry, although even at this early date there was talk of a major bridge across the Tay. The line ended at Ferry-Port-on-Craig for a ferry to Broughty. At the Edinburgh end too, a ferry journey was involved, across the Firth of Forth. In fact passengers leaving the centre of Edinburgh for Dundee first took a train on the Edinburgh, Leith and Newhaven Railway to Newhaven, and then a ferry to Burntisland, and the E&NR train to Ferry-Port-on-Craig. Their journey concluded with another ferry crossing, and then a final train journey on the Dundee and Arbroath Railway from Broughty Ferry to Dundee.

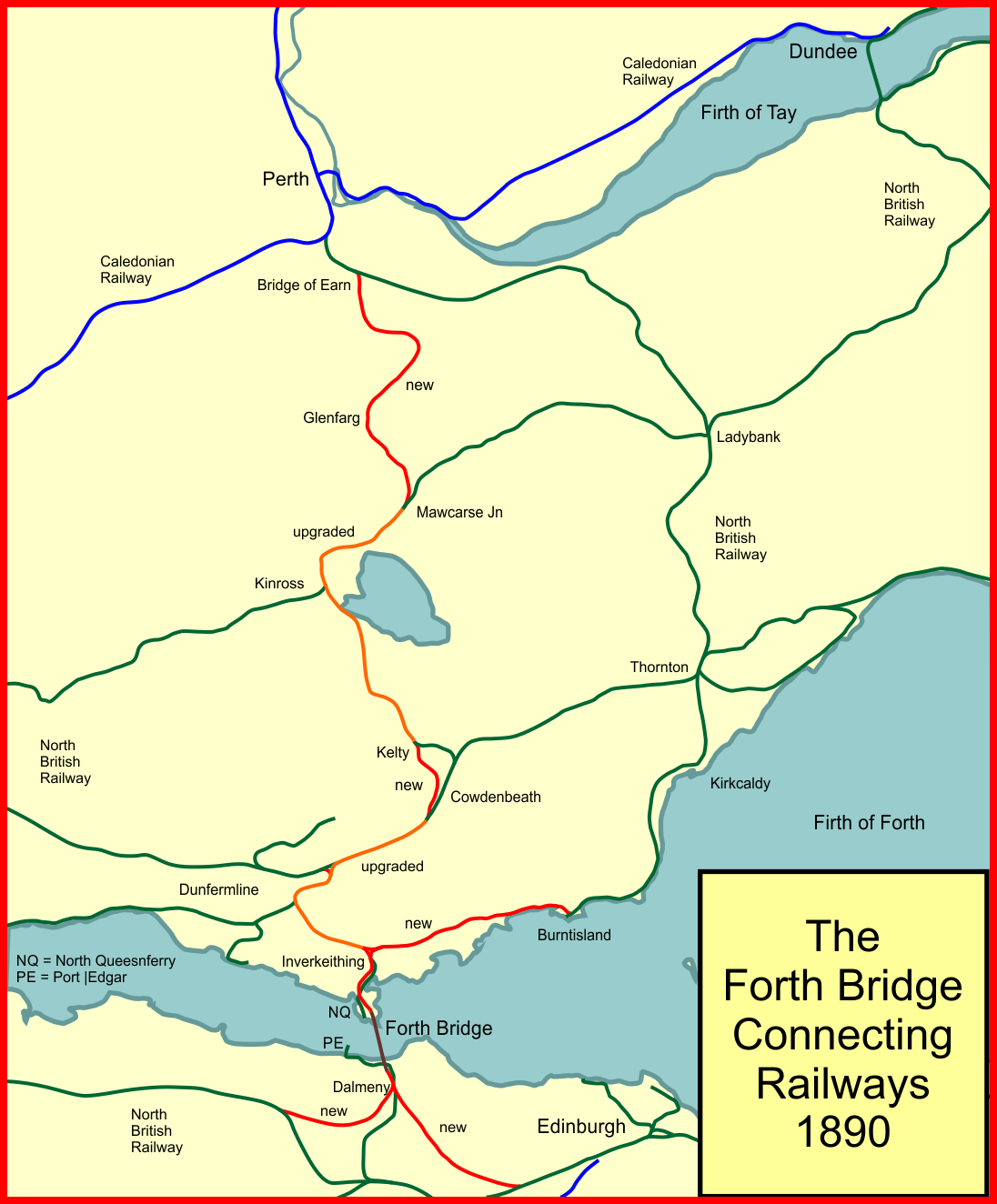
The Forth Bridge approaches

At first the E&NR route, being considerably shorter, (and much quicker than the stage coach journey that was formerly the swiftest,) was considered the better route, but in time the inconvenience of the ferry crossings became a serious disadvantage. For goods and mineral traffic they were even worse, requiring the contents to be physically transshipped from goods wagon to ship and so on.

The successor railway to the E&NR, the Edinburgh, Perth and Dundee Railway, installed train ferries for goods and mineral traffic: the wagons were transferred on to rails on the ferryboats, avoiding the transshipping, but this was still an imperfect arrangement.

In time the multiplicity of Scottish railway companies coalesced: the Scottish Central Railway became part of the Caledonian Railway, and the Edinburgh, Perth and Dundee Railway became part of the North British Railway. Incidentally, Ferry-Port-on-Craig station became renamed Tay-Port, and later Tayport. The Caledonian Railway and the NBR became deadly rivals, each seeking to establish monopolistic primacy in areas they served, while at the same time seeking to penetrate the rival's territory. The Caledonian became dominant north of the Tay and in the central belt and to Carlisle, while the North British Railway had a near-monopoly in Fife, rich in mineral resources, and also from Edinburgh to Berwick where it connected with partner railways in England.

The North British sought to extend northwards, and to create its own route beyond Dundee to Aberdeen, but the two ferry crossings, of the Forth and the Tay, were a major limitation in addition to the competitive tactics of the rival Caledonian Railway.

Construction of bridges over both the bodies of water was long on the agenda for the NBR, but it was the Tay that was bridged first. The engineer Thomas Bouch designed and built the Tay Bridge, which opened in June 1878. This transformed the pattern of railway services in Fife, and new routes for passengers, especially residential and excursion journeys, and minerals, became heavily used. The NBR had been acquiring minor railway lines, and running powers on others, to further its aim of reaching Aberdeen by an independent route, and the Tay Bridge integrated with them. (Note: The NBR never achieved a completely independent route to Aberdeen, being reliant on running powers over the Caledonian Railway line from Kinnaber Junction (near Montrose) northwards, and on the joint Dundee and Arbroath Railway.)

The Tay Bridge fell in December 1879, taking a train down with it; 75 persons perished in the Tay Bridge disaster. Beyond the human cost, there was a huge financial cost to the North British Railway, which at once set about commissioning a second bridge. It opened on 20 June 1887.

== The Forth Bridge ==
The scene was set for completion of the most daunting step: the construction of the Forth Bridge. The capital commitment required was too much for the North British alone, and a consortium of railway companies formed a nominally independent subsidiary, the Forth Bridge Railway Company. As well as the North British Railway, the Great Northern Railway, the North Eastern Railway and the Midland Railway participated in the funding of the structure.

The bridge was formally opened on 4 March 1890.

== Reaching the bridge ==
The bridge crossed the Firth of Forth at Queensferry. As a major element in long-distance railways, the bridge would require appropriate connecting main line railways. The parliamentary authority of a bridge at Queensferry had been given in the Forth Bridge Railway Act 1873 (36 & 37 Vict. c. ccxxxvii), although that was for a dual suspension bridge designed by Bouch. Obviously that could not proceed; nonetheless from 1873 the North British Railway must have been planning how it would arrange routes to lead to a bridge at Queensferry. The present Forth Bridge was authorised by the Forth Bridge Railway Act 1882 (45 & 46 Vict. c. cxiv).

Queensferry was the location of a historic ferry crossing, and the ferry was rail connected in 1877 to give Dunfermline a better connection to Edinburgh. On the southern shore there was a branch to Port Edgar (for the ferry) from Ratho, on the Edinburgh and Glasgow line. On the north side, the Dunfermline and Queensferry Railway ran via Inverkeithing to a terminal at North Queensferry. Both of these lines were built as local, slow-speed single-line branches; moreover they were close to sea level, while the track on the Forth Bridge was carried at 361 feet (110 m) above high water.

In addition, the important Fife coast area had only an indirect route to Dunfermline. The Fife coalfield was producing huge quantities of coal, much of which was exported through the harbour of Burntisland, and a more direct connection was essential.

The priorities, then, were to build a main line railway to current standards to take trains from Edinburgh over the Forth Bridge and onwards to Dundee and Perth respectively; to connect the existing (and still growing) mineral lines in Fife to the new route; and to connect Burntisland to the Dunfermline area. The North British Railway was slow to recognise these necessities.

== The new lines ==
To achieve the required connections, there needed to be these new lines:

- Saughton Junction to Dalmeny, connecting Edinburgh to the bridge;
- the Dalmeny loop from Winchburgh to Dalmeny, connecting from Glasgow and Falkirk to the bridge;
- a line from the northern approach to the bridge to Inverkeithing;
- a line from Inverkeithing to Burntisland;
- new line connecting Kinross and Perth directly, known later as the Glenfarg line;
- spurs at Inverkeithing and Dunfermline;
- a deviation passing Cowdenbeath and running to Kelty.

In addition the Kinross-shire route was to be converted to double track and upgraded, becoming part of the modern main line; similarly the portion of the Dunfermline and Queensferry Railway on from Inverkeithing to Townhill Junction was to be doubled and modernised.

== South of the Forth ==
On the south side of the Forth Bridge, the immediate approaches ran to a new Dalmeny station, necessary at a higher level than the former station on the Port Edgar line. That branch joined in at Dalmeny station, and at the south end of the station two new main lines diverged from the old Kirkliston line to Ratho.

Striking south east was the new Edinburgh main line, which joined in to the Edinburgh and Glasgow line at Corstorphine; the junction was later named Saughton Junction. The line was six miles long. The other new main line ran south-west in a long curve to join the Edinburgh and Glasgow line in the direction of Falkirk and Glasgow line at Winchburgh; this line was four miles in length. The North British Railway came very late to the realisation that these lines were necessary; it was only in December 1887 the Company deposited plans for the two new lines.

The Glasgow Herald described the work in progress in 1889, in a very long article, only a small part of which is reproduced here.

The line from the present-day Saughton Junction (then at the old Corstorphine station) to Dalmeny was to give direct main line access from Edinburgh to the bridge:

The Corstorphine and Dalmeny Railway: This line, though not the shortest, was, it is safe to say, one of the easiest of all the new railways [connecting with the Forth Bridge] to construct ... Still a great deal of work had to be done before the line could be formed... Starting at Dalmeny Station, about three-quarters of a mile from the bridge... the railway diverges to the south-east, and takes as straight a line as may be for Corstorphine, where it joins the Edinburgh and Glasgow Railway... The first part goes through undulating country, so that some work had to be done. Here occurs the heaviest cutting on the line, half a mile long, and through that most intractable substance, boulder clay. The contractor had to face the excavating of 300,000 cubic yards... Emerging from this the valley of the River Almond is crossed and ... an embankment nearly a mile long and in some places 50 feet high was found necessary... The river itself is spanned by a viaduct 230 feet long, and consisting of a central girder of 140 feet, and one at each end of 45 feet... Passing Turnhouse Farm--where the farmers are petitioning the company to have a passenger and goods station--and under the Linlithgow Road, the line rises by easy gradients [then] descending by a gradient of 1 in 140, the Bathgate Road is next reached... A gradient of 1 in 100, the heaviest on the route, takes the line into Corstorphine. Here a great change has been made. The miserable little wayside place is being converted ... into a large handsome station... We have an "island" platform about 500 feet long, flanked with lines of rails and side platforms. The station at Dalmeny will be abolished, that at the south end of the Forth Bridge taking its place... The cost of the undertaking, without the land, will be near £60,000.

Trains would be able to run direct from Glasgow to the bridge, by way of Winchburgh, but that line was late:

The Winchburgh and Dalmeny Line: In point of time of commencement and of present advancement this railway is much behind the others. As will be remembered, Parliamentary powers for its construction were only obtained during last session, and these were got after an opposition which at one time threatened to be fatal to the bill... The new line will leave the Edinburgh and Glasgow Railway near Winchburgh Station, and running northwards ... will join the new railway from Corstorphine at Dalmeny, close to the south end of the Forth Bridge... the length of the new railway is only 4 1/2 miles... The contractor has to contend with a large quantity of water. To do this effectually a steam-pump had been erected... The contractor is erecting a steam-navvy at a cutting near Humbie quarry, and a similar mechanical means of excavation is to be employed in another cutting at Humbie Farm... It is expected the work will be finished by the end of March next year [1890]... The construction of the railway will probably cost, excluding the price of land, about £45,000.

The Corstorphine and Winchburgh lines were to come together at Dalmeny, where the Forth Bridge Railway would take over: (Note: For a time the new station at Dalmeny was named "Forth Bridge"; it was renamed Dalmeny for Forth Bridge on 28 April 1890; from Thomas, The North British Railway, volume 2.)

The South Approach to the Bridge: This stretch of about three-quarters of a mile, from the junction of the Winchburgh and Corstorphine lines at Dalmeny to the south end of the bridge, belongs to the Forth Bridge Company. It contains one deep cutting of about 80,000 cubic yards, partly in rock, and a considerable embankment leading on to the bridge. Begun in May last year [1890], the work is almost finished, at a cost of less than £10,000. In addition, Forth Bridge Station, as it will probably be called, is in course of erection.

== Inverkeithing lines ==
The northern Forth Bridge approaches involved difficult engineering; the Inverkeithing station was resited, and the Forth Bridge approach line ran to the west of the North Queensferry line, running then through a 386 yard tunnel beneath Inverkeithing town. It then followed a shelf above the Inner Bay of Inverkeithing, then turning south-east, crossing the North Queensferry line on Jamestown Viaduct. Climbing at 1 in 70 the line now ran through North Queensferry Tunnel, 569 yards, joining to the immediate approaches of the Forth Bridge just south of the new North Queensferry station. An extinct volcano was encountered in constructing the route; the exceptionally hard material making the formation of the cutting difficult.

This new line, like the half mile or so of railway between the south end of the bridge and Dalmeny, is the property not of the North British but of the Forth Bridge Railway Company. The two form what are called the approaches to the bridge. The north approach, two miles in length, was commenced ... in September 1887. Owing to the extremely irregular and rocky nature of the ground, the work, considering the shortness of the route, has been excessive. There are two tunnels, one under Inverkeithing 400 yards long, and the other, which is shorter, close to the end of the great bridge. Besides these, there is a very heavy cutting, and two very large embankments... The total amount of excavation and embankments is about 300,000 cubic yards. The cost, including land, which is here very cheap, will be about £90,000.

North from Inverkeithing, the route followed the Dunfermline and Queensferry Railway, but the track was doubled, and the inconveniently located Comely Park station was relocated closer to the town. The line joined the eastward route of the old Dunfermline branch of the Edinburgh, Perth and Dundee Railway at Townhill Junction. A south-to-west curve was laid, from Touch South Junction to Touch North Junction, enabling direct running from the Forth Bridge towards Alloa.

A fine new station has been erected at Comely Bank, which in future will be the station from Dunfermline on the new route to the north. On the West side of the line are waiting-rooms and the ticket office, in front of which is a spacious platform covered over by a verandah supported on neat cast-iron pillars carrying girders. On the opposite side is an "island" platform with all necessary accommodation for passengers. A number of local trains are to be run to Dunfermline, which owing to the facilities which the Forth Bridge supplies, may now be considered a suburb of Edinburgh, and the object of erecting the island platform is to keep local trains standing at the platform out of the way of the expresses. At Inverkeithing Junction a new station has been erected and arrangements of the most complete description have been made for carrying on the traffic here. A short distance North of the station is the junction, where trains passing over the Forth Bridge will be switched on to the routes they are to follow.

A new line was built along the coast to Burntisland, turning sharply east at Inverkeithing and running through Aberdour, keeping tight to the coast from there to join the old terminus at Burntisland. The Fordell Railway was lowered at the point of intersection to give a good gradient to the new main line.

When the abortive scheme of Sir Thomas Bouch for bridging the Firth of Forth was still in the realms of potential existence, the North British Railway Company acquired powers for constructing this line. Work had just been started and the track staked off, when the bridge was abandoned. Nothing more was done till the present bridge had been considerably advanced... The railway, which is 6 miles 1560 yards ... long, extends from Inverkeithing to Burntisland. Leaving the Inverkeithing and Dunfermline route a little to the north of Inverkeithing station, it immediately trends north-eastward. At first it is some little distance inland, but keeps parallel to the coast.

[In the Fordell estate,] a colliery railway from pits on [the] Fordel (sic) estate crosses, running down to St David's on the coast. The colliery line had to be lowered for about three-quarters of a mile, and this had to be done in such a way as not to interfere with the mineral traffic...

The Inverkeithing to Burntisland line was opened to goods and mineral traffic on 16 April 1890, but it was not ready for passenger operation, which did not start until 2 June 1890. Passenger trains from Edinburgh to the Fife coast lines at Kirkcaldy and beyond would now have a through route, superseding the old Granton ferry passage. At Inverkeithing too, a triangular junction was being formed, with a north spur enabling through running from the West Fife mineral lines to Burntisland. The line opened from Inverkeithing to Burntisland for goods traffic on 24 April 1890, but it was not yet ready for passengers.

== Kelty, Kinross and Glenfarg ==
The North British wanted to incorporate Perth into its network. There were already the Kinross lines, built independently by the Fife and Kinross Railway and the Kinross-shire Railway. These had been built as country branch lines with a dominant mineral traffic at the southern end, and they were not laid out for main line running. The North British was upgrading them to double track and main line running standards. The entry to towards Kinross from the south was particularly tortuous, curving off the Dunfermline to Thornton line sharply at Lumphinnans. A new line was being built improving the access, from south of Cowdenbeath, with a new Cowdenbeath station on the new line, and running to Kelty. The descent from Cowdenbeath to Kelty had long been subjected to mining subsidence, and much work had to be done to prepare the line for main line standards. In fact in the following years much work was necessary to keep the line fit.

A new line, 2 3/4 miles in length has been constructed between Kelty and Cowdenbeath. The Kelty Fork, as it is termed, shortens the route by about two miles. From Cowdenbeath Junction to Townhill Junction, a distance of about three miles, the main line between Thornton and Dunfermline (North) is run upon. A doubling of the existing line between Townhill Junction and Inverkeithing has been effected.

The railway from Kelty to Mawcarse Junction had to be doubled and upgraded:

This section is 10 miles in length. Hitherto the single line of railway had been of little importance in regard to the general traffic of the country, as it had a mere local use. Trains and passengers were not numerous; but at its south end there was some coal traffic in connection with Cowdenbeath. Henceforth it will form a part of the great East Coast route from London to the North... Bridges... are very numerous, both as regards roads crossing over the railway and the line passing above roads and small streams. All these bridges have had to be taken down, and new ones suitable to the increased breadth of the railway substituted... A considerable part of the undertaking has been the taking down of the little old stations, and the erecting of new and more commodious and improved ones in their stead... At Kelty, where the new line from Cowdenbeath joins, the station is a handsome one, with a commodious island platform.

At the northern end, a new connection to Perth had to be built; it had to be built through very difficult terrain and it was expensive to build. It was known as the Glenfarg Line, running between Mawcarse Junction, a few miles north of Kinross, and Bridge of Earn, near Hilton Junction on the line from Ladybank. The North British Railway already had running powers from Hilton Junction to Perth over the Caledonian Railway main line.

The Glenfarg line descended to Bridge of Earn at 1 in 75 and involved two tunnels as well as a sinuous line.

This new line is also well advanced. The contractors ... began operations in September, 1887. As the greater part of the land was not procured, however, till between the following January and March, the works were not fairly commenced till the spring of 1888. The line leaves the existing railway at Mawcarse, a station some two miles north-east of Milnathort, and it extends with a general northerly direction for ten miles to Bridge of Earn, where it joins the railway from Newburgh and Ladybank to Perth. The first three miles of the route, rising by a gradient of 1 in 100 from Mawcarse to Damhead, gave some work, though not so much as corresponding sections farther north.

A neat passenger station is being erected at Damhead [Glenfarg]. Here the railway enters the beautiful valley of the river Farg, and declining at the rate of 1 in 74½, runs alongside the stream and the Great North Road as far as Bein Inn... It became necessary to pierce the ridge [of a spur of the Ochil Hills] by a tunnel about 500 yards long... The cost of this railway, with that of the small Cowdenbeath section previously referred to ... will probably be about £220,000.

== The bridge opens ==
The Forth Bridge was formally opened on 4 March 1890. However, the North British Railway had been slow in completing the approach railways, and they were not ready. Trains for the Forth Bridge from the south had to use the old single line from Ratho via Kirkliston. On the north side, none of the major improvements were complete, and the Burntisland line and the Glenfarg line were not ready. For the time being only the Dunfermline local passenger trains and some mineral trains used the bridge. Although for the time being no main line trains used the bridge, a number of excursions used it:

Yesterday [14 April 1890] the first passenger trains to cross the Forth Bridge from Dundee to Edinburgh were run from the Tay Bridge station. The North British Company offered special facilities to the public, and nearly 2000 people applied for tickets. Although three specials had to be despatched in addition to the ordinary trains, the officials were able to overtake the extra work without the general traffic being interrupted.

Seeing the bridge itself was the objective for many people:

Considerable disappointment was expressed by the excursionists on crossing the Forth Bridge, as they could not from the carriage windows command a proper view of the structure, and consequently a large number proceeded by train, boat and brakes to South Queensferry during the day.

== Full opening of the bridge and approach routes ==
On 2 June 1890 the Forth Bridge and the new routes approaching it were ready for full operation, and the new timetable, taking advantage of the new route opportunities, was adopted. Now at last the dramatically shorter journey times could be implemented, and a considerable increase in train movements took place, handling an equally large increase in traffic.

The opening of the Forth bridge marked a huge advance in the position of the North British Railway. The other partners in the Forth Bridge scheme, the GNR, the NER and the Midland Railway had laid out considerable quantities of cash to build the bridge, miles from their own territory, and now expected to benefit.

However the first days of operation were beset with serious organisational problems, centring on the inadequacy of Waverley station in handling the increased volume of traffic and remarshalling it. In those days most passenger trains exchanged portions, or single coaches, with other trains, and there was not the track layout at Waverley to achieve it.

The connections with the Forth Bridge having now been completed, the North British Railway Company ran the first of their new trains from Aberdeen to the south on Monday. From Aberdeen to London there are no fewer than six trains on weekdays and a mail on Sundays, leaving at 3.30 p.m. and reaching King's Cross at 5.45 a.m. and St Pancras at 7.20 a.m... The first train left Aberdeen on Monday punctually at 6.20 a.m. Two powerful engines were put on. There were not many persons in the station at the time of departure, but the train had a very good complement of passengers... This train is timed to arrive in Edinburgh at 9.42 a.m., where passengers are allowed eighteen minutes for refreshments.

The first train due at Aberdeen from the south at 8.55 a.m. came in fully two minutes before the advertised time, and was fairly well filled. The train due here at 10.50 a.m. was, however, not so well up to time, arriving at 11.30. The next, due at 1.35 p.m., did not come in until 2.48 p.m.; while the one due at 6 p.m. only arrived at 7.15 p.m. Perhaps the train that excited the most interest was that which was due at 8.30 p.m., being the first that had a direct connection from London. Owing, however, to the new service upsetting so entirely the arrangements along the route, this train did not reach Aberdeen until 10.44 p.m., being about two hours and fifteen minutes late. The North British train due at 10.20 p.m. arrived at 11.30, while the Caledonian train due at 10.50 did not make its appearance till 12.20...

Edinburgh Waverley was the focus of the congestion; the main departure platform was only four feet wide, and the station was approached by congested double track routes:

The result of the new service at Edinburgh was a breakdown at the Waverley Station, and a total disorganisation for the day, both for the passenger and the goods traffic all over the system. The earlier morning trains got away in fair time, though even they were late; but after eight o'clock a congestion of traffic began to set in. The block occurred by the removal of the Fife trains, always heavy, and on Monday heavier than usual, to the already very limited space at the west end of the station, where there is no room to marshal them. The narrow departure platform at the west end of the station was crowded from end to end with people waiting for their trains, and there were from thirty to forty barrows of luggage also waiting to be despatched.

Very few of the trains were got away much under an hour late, and the incoming trains were correspondingly detained. The difficulty was to get in and out of the station, there being positively no room to marshal the different trains. The incoming trains had to wait outside Haymarket until the road was free. Some of them when they did get into Edinburgh could not get near a platform, and one Bathgate train came in about an hour late, and a large number of the passengers had to get out upon the line. While the west end of the station, from which the Forth Bridge traffic is conducted, was in such a congested condition, the east end presented a correspondingly great quietness and inactivity, consequent on the withdrawal of the through trains for the north by the way of the Burntisland ferry.

The new train service from Aberdeen to London inaugurated by the North British Railway company on Monday was found to work more smoothly yesterday than it did on the opening day, and the management hope that, as time advances, and the new system has had a fair trial, no difficulty will be experienced in the running of the new trains.

== Tunnel collapse ==
The North British Railway had more bad publicity coming. On 17 August 1890 there was a partial collapse in Winchburgh tunnel, on the Edinburgh and Glasgow main line; although the work was quickly repaired it caused disruption for some time. It reopened for single-line working only on 5 September 1890.

== Waverley station ==
The primary problem was the marshalling of train portions at Waverley, and passing the trains over the double track either side of the station. At that time many long distance trains combined and divided, giving through carriages from many remote places which had to be exchanged to other trains. Moreover even local trains conveyed individual vehicles, especially luggage and perishable vans, that had to be transferred to long-distance trains.

The North British belatedly set about improving and expanding Waverley station. This was not easy because of the constrained location in a high amenity area, and hostility to railway encroachment was at a high level. Nonetheless, on 5 July 1891 (Note: Smith and Anderson say 5 July 1890.) the North British obtained powers in an act of Parliament to quadruple the line from Corstorphine (that is, Saughton Junction) in the west to Waverley, and from Waverley to Abbeyhill in the east. This involved duplicating the three tunnel sections. In addition Waverley station itself was much expanded, and when the work was completed in 1900 it covered 23 acres and had nineteen platforms. North Bridge was reconstructed and incorporated into the station structure; one-third of the cost was borne by the North British Railway, and the whole scheme at Waverley cost £1.5 million. The station was architecturally magnificent, although the baroque stone and joinery work in the booking hall was somewhat oppressive, and the pedestrian access from the street was still narrow and bleak.

The North British set about building a hotel too; it opened on 15 October 1902. Smith and Anderson describe it:

There was accommodation for 400, including spacious bachelor suites let by the year for "gentlemen residing in the city". Ground floor public rooms included the Palm Lounge, Ballroom, Coffee Lounge, Supper Room and Reading Room. All were elaborately decorated with mahogany panelling, silk wall hangings, plaster friezes and Renaissance ceilings. As a landmark it was superb and on a clear day the tower could be seen from the Forth Bridge approaches with Arthur's Seat as a backdrop. It also complemented the monuments of Calton Hill perfectly when viewed along Princes Street.

== The present day ==
In 1890 there was bitter competition between the North British Railway and the Caledonian Railway, for the traffic northwards from central Scotland. When the railways of Great Britain were nationalised in 1948, they were brought under unified management, and the loss of traffic to road-based alternatives caused an examination of what were then duplicate routes.

Naturally the Forth and Tay bridges continued in use, and the North British Railway route between them became the main line to Aberdeen, at the expense of the Caledonian Railway route via Strathmore. However the North British Railway route from Edinburgh to Perth via Cowdenbeath, Kinross and Glenfarg was closed, the Caledonian line via Falkirk and Stirling becoming the sole route.

The end of the supremacy of the West Fife coalfield led to the collapse of the mineral railways serving it, and the spur connection towards the former Stirling and Dunfermline Railway and The West of Fife Mineral Railway closed.

Accordingly the lines from Saughton Junction to the Forth Bridge, and the western connection from Winchburgh to Dalmeny remain (2015) in use, although the latter has a very limited usage. From the Forth Bridge through Inverkeithing to Burntisland is part of the main line from Edinburgh to Dundee. The route from Inverkeithing to Dunfermline and Cowdenbeath remains in use. The principal traffic is stopping passenger trains, which continue on the old Edinburgh, Perth and Dundee Railway route as far as a new station named Glenrothes.

== Route topography ==
=== Saughton Junction (west of Haymarket) to Hilton Junction (south of Perth) ===
New line Saughton Junction to Inverkeithing South Junction

- Corstorphine Junction; later Saughton Junction; route diverges from Edinburgh to Glasgow Line;
- South Gyle; opened 9 May 1985;
- Turnhouse; opened September 1897; closed 22 September 1930;
- Dalmeny South Junction; convergence of earlier line from Ratho to Port Edgar, and of line from Winchburgh Junction;;
- Forth Bridge (station); opened 5 March 1890; renamed Dalmeny later in 1890; replaced station on Dunfermline and Queensferry line; commencement of Forth Bridge Railway;
- Forth Bridge;
- North Queensferry; opened 2 June 1890; replaced station on Dunfermline and Queensferry line;
- Inverkeithing South Junction; convergence of Dunfermline and Queensferry Railway (from North Queensferry); end of Forth Bridge Railway;
- Inverkeithing; opened November 1877;
- Inverkeithing Central Junction; divergence of line to Burntisland;
- Inverkeithing West Junction; convergence of north spur;
- Rosyth Halt; opened unadvertised 28 March 1917; opened to public 1 December 1917; still open;
- Charlestown Junction; convergence of line from Kincardine;
- Dunfermline Comely Park; opened 1 November 1877; reconstructed 1889 and relocated a short distance eastwards; renamed Dunfermline Lower; renamed Dunfermline Town 26 January 2000;
- Touch South Junction; divergence of line to Dunfermline Upper and West of Fife Mineral Railway;
- Dunfermline Queen Margaret; opened 26 January 2000;
- Townhill Junction; convergence of line from Dunfermline Upper; divergence of West of Fife Mineral Railway to Lilliehill Junction;
- Cowdenbeath South Junction; divergence from original Edinburgh, Perth and Dundee Railway route; start of new line;
- Cowdenbeath New; opened 2 June 1890; later renamed Cowdenbeath;
- Cowdenbeath North Junction; divergence of 1919 line to Lumphinnans;
- Kelty South Junction; end of new line; convergence with old line from Lumphinnans;
- Kelty; opened 20 June 1860; closed 22 September 1930; divergence of colliery lines;
- Blairadam; opened 20 June 1860; closed 22 September 1930;
- Kinross; temporary terminus opened 20 June 1860; closed soon after 20 September 1860 when line extended;
- Kinross; opened soon after 20 September 1860; renamed Loch Leven 1871; closed 1 September 1921;
- Kinross; opened 20 August 1858; renamed Hopefield Junction 1860; renamed Kinross Junction 1871; resited 200 yards north 1890; closed 5 January 1970; convergence of Devon Valley line;
- Milnathort; opened 9 March 1858; closed 15 June 1964;
- Mawcarse; opened 9 March 1858; then Mawcarse Junction until 1962; closed 15 June 1964; divergence off from line to Ladybank; start of new line;
- Glenfarg; opened 2 June 1890; closed 15 June 1964;
- Bridge of Earn; opened 1 February 1892 (relocation of EP&DR station); closed 15 June 1964; convergence with original Edinburgh, Perth and Dundee line to Perth; end of new line;
- Hilton Junction; convergence with Caledonian Railway main line from Stirling.

=== Winchburgh Junction to Dalmeny ===
- Winchburgh Junction; divergence from Glasgow to Edinburgh line;
- Dalmeny South Junction; convergence with line from Edinburgh;

=== Inverkeithing Central Junction to Burntisland ===
- Inverkeithing Central Junction; above; divergence from line to Dunfermline;
- Inverkeithing East Junction; convergence of north south at Inverkeithing;
- Aberdour; opened 2 June 1890;
- Burntisland; new station replaced earlier terminus.

=== Inverkeithing North Spur ===
- Inverkeithing West Junction; above;
- Inverkeithing East Junction; above.

=== Touch Curve ===
- Touch South Junction; above; divergence from line towards Cowdenbeath;
- Touch North Junction; convergence with former Stirling and Dunfermline line, towards Alloa.
