= Kaichi Watanabe =

Japanese engineer

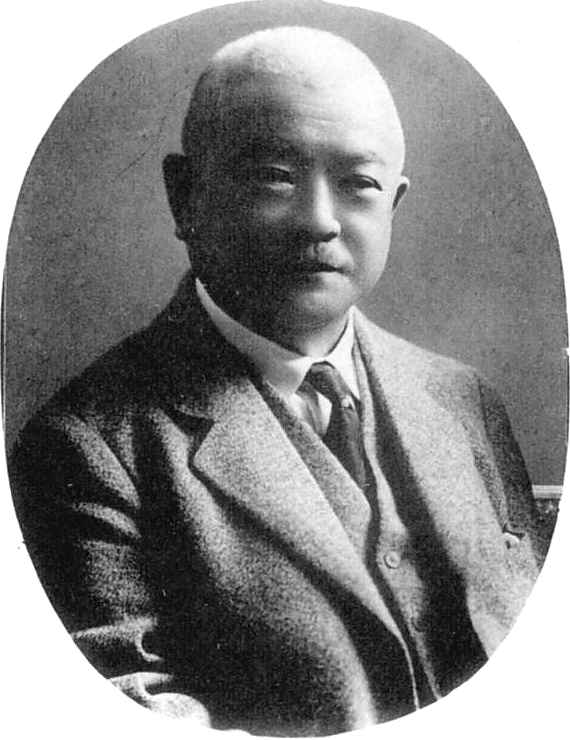
- Born: 22 March 1858; Asahi, Shinano (now Tatsuno, Nagano), Japan
- Died: 4 December 1932 (aged 74); Tokyo, Japan
- Other name: 渡邊 嘉一
- Occupation: engineer
- Children: Takashi Asahina (conductor)

Kaichi Watanabe (渡邊 嘉一, Watanabe Kaichi; 22 March 1858 – 4 December 1932) was a Japanese engineer who studied and worked in Scotland, United Kingdom during the 1880s. He was one of the first Japanese engineers who came to study in the UK. He is best known for his work with Sir John Fowler and Sir Benjamin Baker in cantilever bridge construction, notably on the Forth Bridge.

Watanabe studied under Henry Dyer, the Scottish engineer associated with technical education in Japan. After obtaining a degree from the Faculty of Technology of the University of Tokyo, he studied at the University of Glasgow from 1885 and graduated with a Civil Engineering and Bachelor of Science degree, and worked as a construction foreman on the Forth Bridge, which crossed the Firth of Forth in eastern Scotland in 1890.

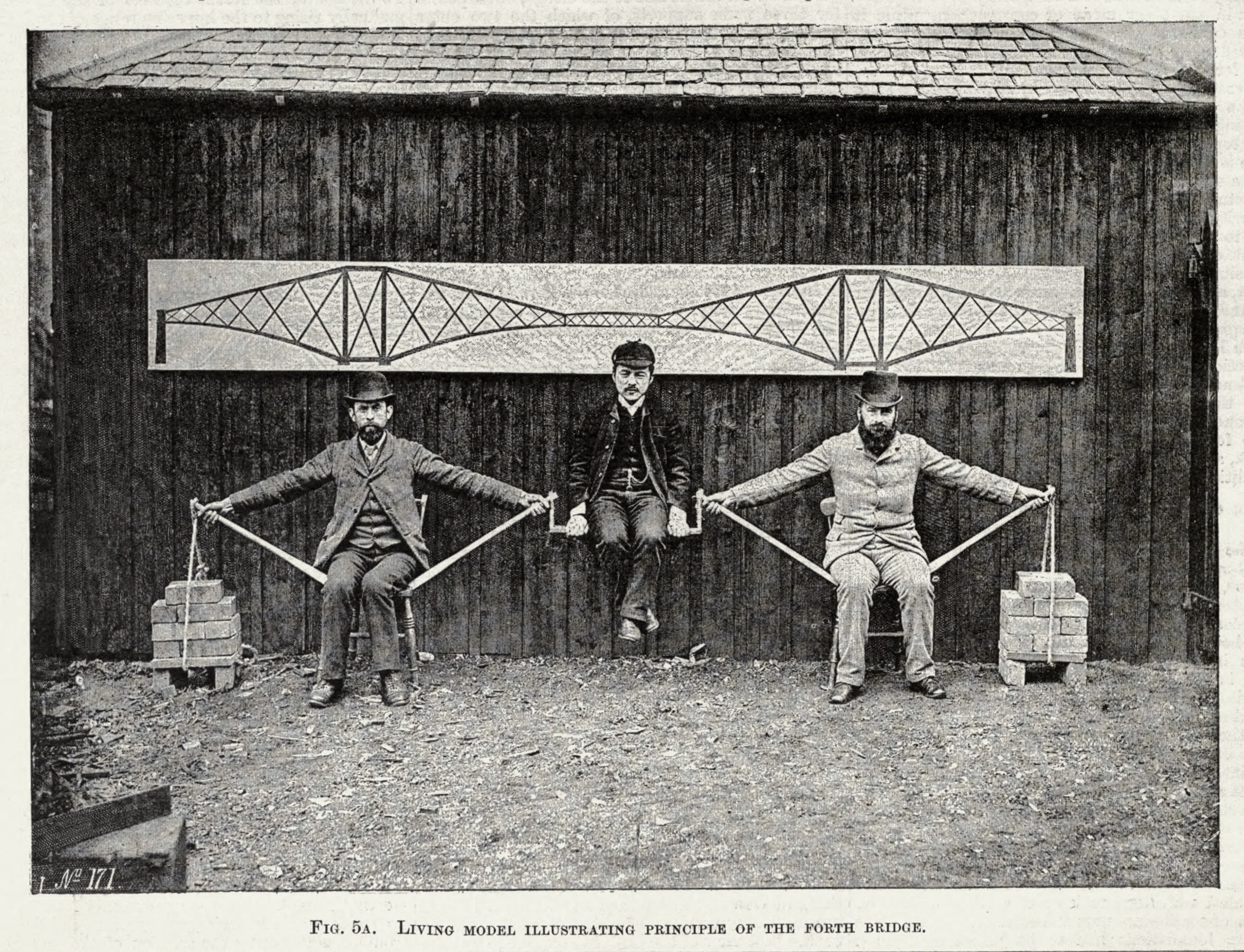
Kaichi Watanabe (centre, seated) demonstrating the cantilever principle

Watanabe's image became well known in the 1887 photograph illustrating the cantilever principle, in which he poses with Fowler and Baker, suspended between the engineers who form a cantilever structure with their arms.

Watanabe returned to Japan in 1888, where he became the chief engineer of the Nippon Doboku Company. He then worked at a number of other companies, including the Hokuestsu Railway Company. He was president of the Sangu Railway Company, Keio Electric Tramway, the Ishikawajima shipyard in Tokyo, and the Kansai Gas company.

Conductor Takashi Asahina was the illegitimate son of Watanabe.
