= Asahina Takashi =

Japanese orchestral conductor

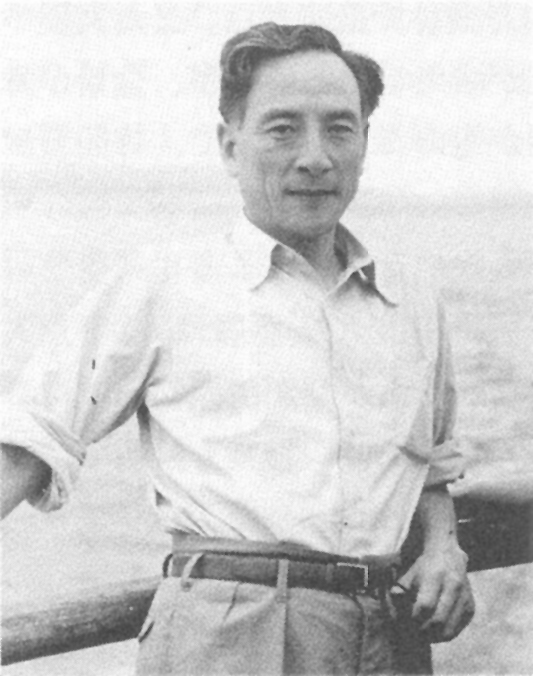
- Asahina Takashi at the establishment of the Kansai Opera Association in 1949
- Born: 9 July 1908; Tokyo, Empire of Japan
- Died: 29 December 2001 (aged 93); Higashinada-ku, Kobe, Japan
- Occupation: conductor

Asahina Takashi (朝比奈 隆; 9 July 1908 – 29 December 2001) was a Japanese conductor.

== Person ==
Asahina was born in Tokyo as an illegitimate child of Kaichi Watanabe. He founded the Kansai Symphonic Orchestra (today the Osaka Philharmonic Orchestra) in 1947 and remained its chief conductor until his death in Kobe. Inspired by a meeting with Wilhelm Furtwängler in the 1950s, he began a lifelong attachment to the music of Anton Bruckner, recording the complete Bruckner symphonies several times. For many years, he was associated with the North German Radio Orchestra in Hamburg. In May and October 1996, he appeared with the Chicago Symphony Orchestra.

== Awards and honors ==
- Asahi Prize
- Medal with Purple Ribbon
- Order of the Rising Sun, 3rd class
- Person of Cultural Merit
- Order of Culture
- Officers Crosses of the Order of Merit of the Federal Republic of Germany
- Cross of Honour for Science and Art, First Class

Cultural offices
Preceded by none	Music Directors, Osaka Philharmonic Orchestra; 1947–2001	Succeeded by Eiji Oue
