= Sone Tatsuzō =

Japanese architect (1853–1937)

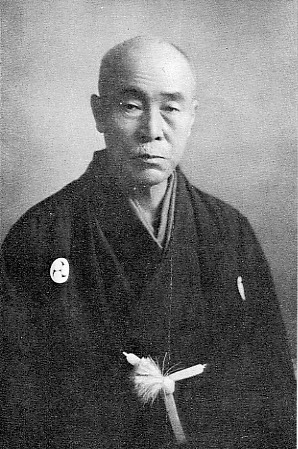
- Sone Tatsuzō
- Born: 3 January 1853; Tokyo, Japan
- Died: 6 December 1937 (aged 84); Tokyo, Japan
- Education: Imperial College of Engineering
- Occupation: Architect
- Buildings: Keio University Old Library (1912)

Sone Tatsuzō (曽禰 達蔵; January 3, 1853—December 6, 1937) was a Japanese architect noted for his use of western architectural styles in the later Meiji period. One of the famous disciples of Josiah Conder.

== Early life and career ==
Together with Katayama Tokuma, Tatsuno Kingo and Satachi Shichijiro, one of a group of renowned architectural students at the Imperial College of Engineering, Tokyo, and a protege of British architect Josiah Conder.

Dispatched to London in 1901 by the co-founder of Mitsubishi, Iwasaki Yanosuke, Sone returned to design and supervise construction of the Senshokaku, an elegant two story mansion built on a steep hillside overlooking the Nagasaki shipyards.

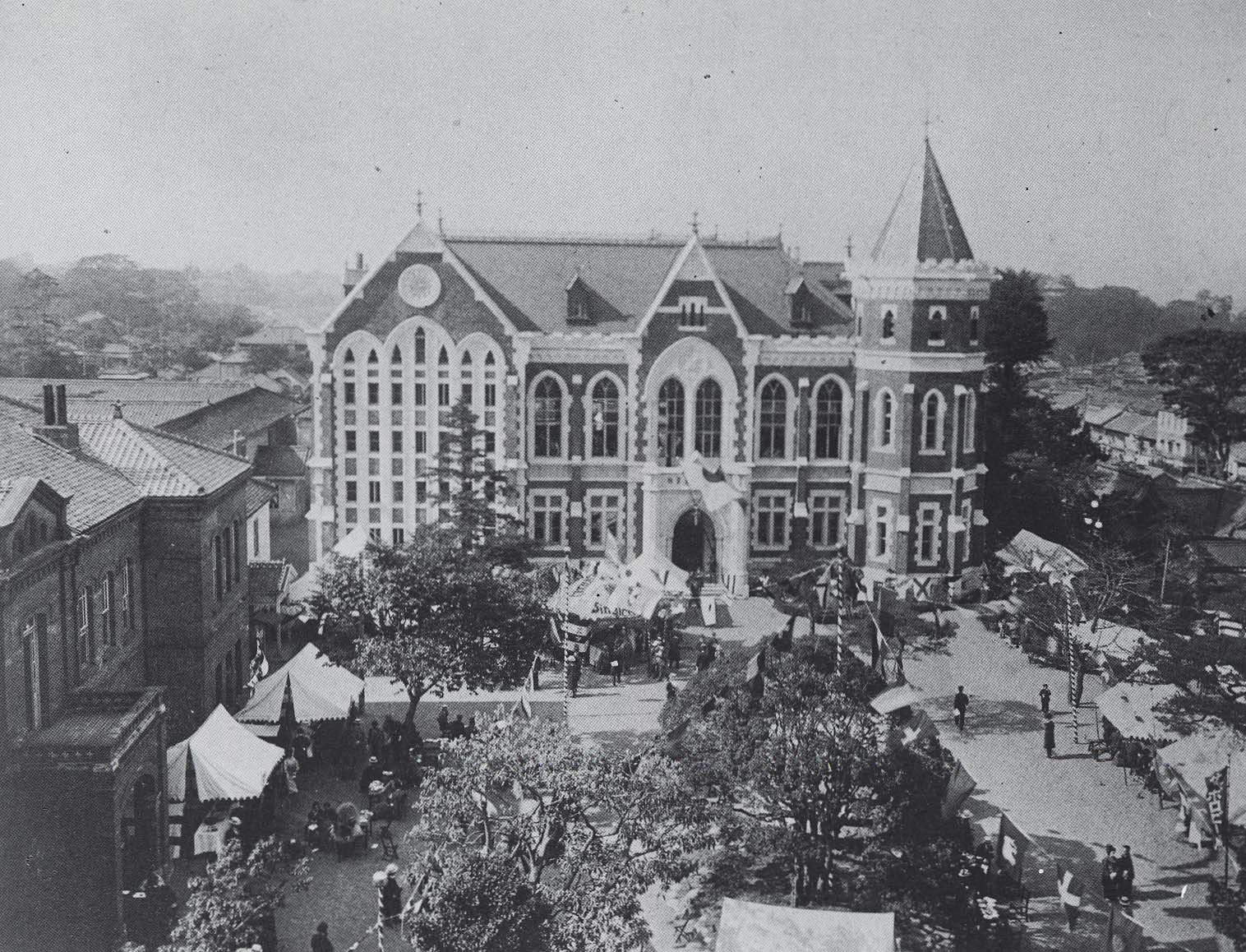
Keio University Old University Library Building in May 1912

Sone's most famous work is the Old University Library Building (1912), still standing on the Keio University main campus at Mita. In collaboration with his architectural office partner, Chujō Seiichirō, Sone produced a building in Edwardian neo-gothic style in red brick with white stone dressings. The Old Library has become possibly the most recognized landmark of the university. This late Meiji period structure employed the latest technology of the time, including steel beams and reinforced concrete floor slabs as well as electrical circuits, gas and steam heat.

In the period between the end of the Meiji era and the outbreak of World War II, Sone and Chujo also designed many other buildings for Keio University including the Keio Corporate Administration Building and the First School Building, both still features of the Mita campus.

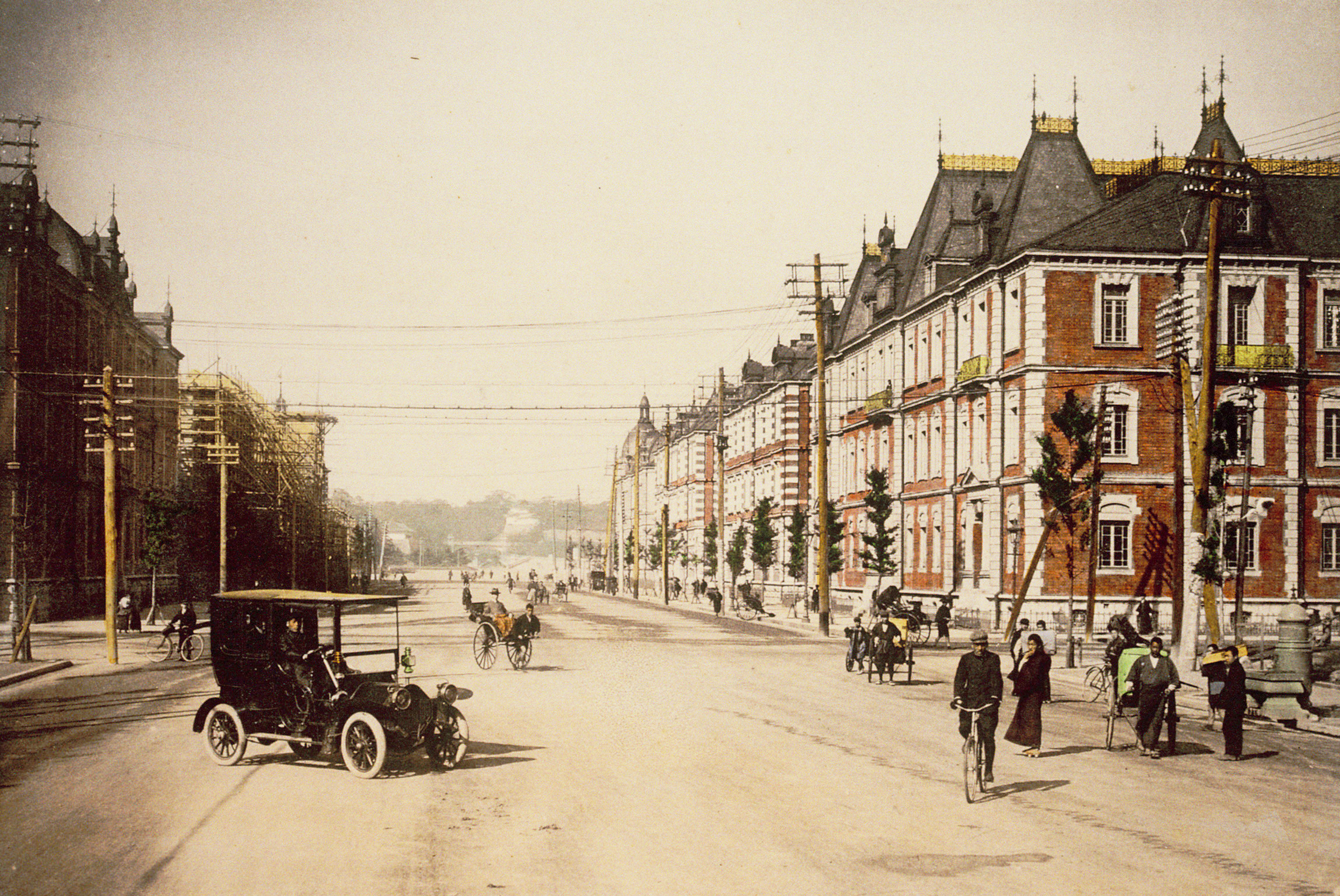
1920 photo with a view of the Mitsubishi headquarters in Marunouchi

Sone as superintendent, together with his former university instructor Josiah Conder as architect, was also responsible for many of the famed red-brick Mitsubishi buildings at Marunouchi, Tokyo. The Marunouchi district was designed as a showcase of earthquake resistant buildings and the Mitsubishi zaibatsu went on to construct over twenty such buildings on the site prior to the Great Kantō earthquake of 1923.

== Buildings ==
- 1912 Keio University Old Library
