= Rokumeikan (play) =

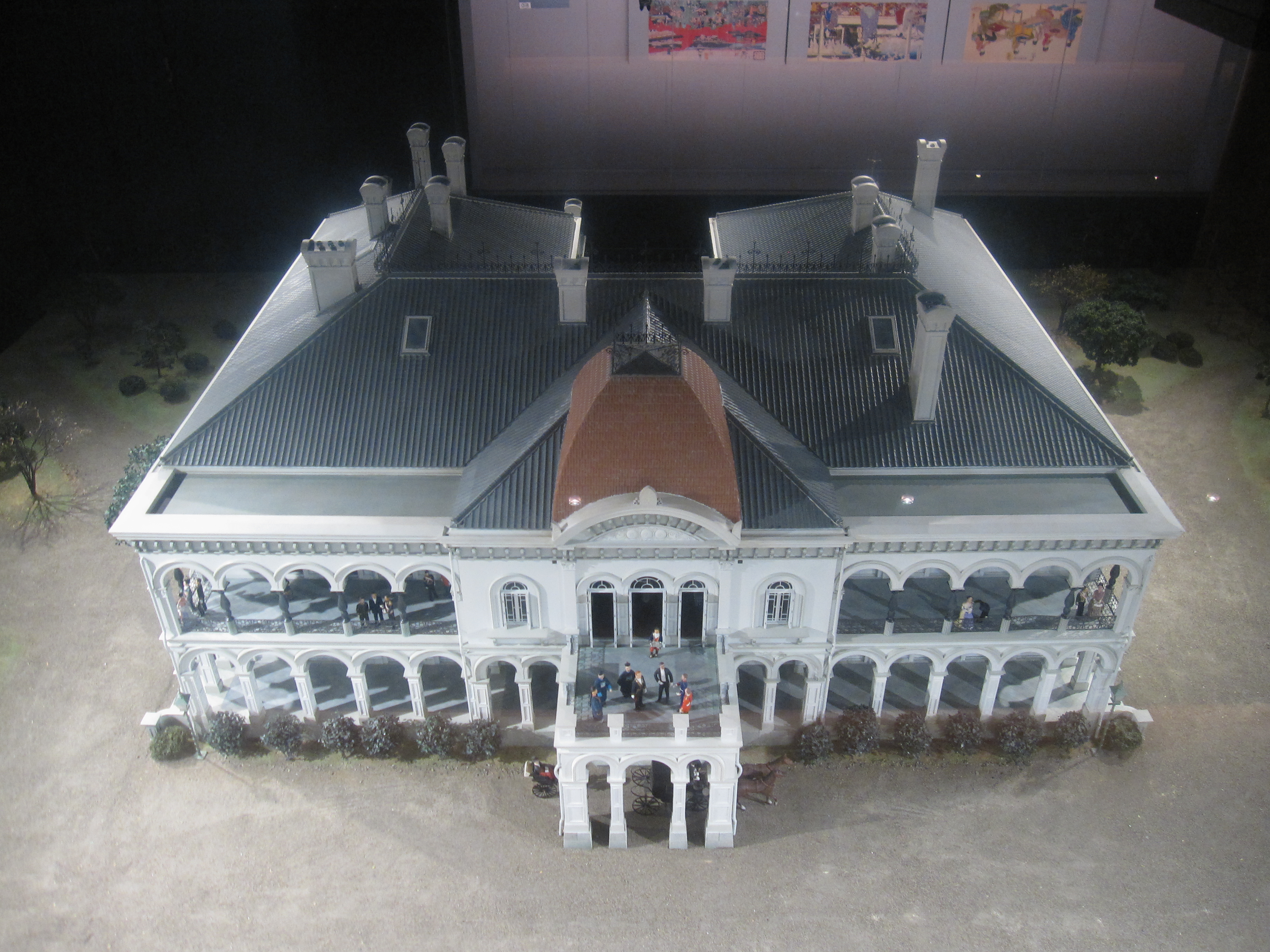
Architectural model of the Rokumeikan, at the Edo-Tokyo Museum

Rokumeikan is a four-act costume drama by the Japanese writer Yukio Mishima. It was commissioned by the Bungakuza group for its 20th anniversary, and its first run was from 27 November to 9 December 1956 at the Daiichi Seimei Hall, with Haruko Sugimura playing Asako and Nobuo Nakamura playing Kageyama. The text was published in the December 1956 issue of Bungakukai.

The play was enormously successful, and toured the country. By many accounts, it was the most successful play by Mishima and has been revived on several occasions. An English translation by Hiroaki Sato was published in 2002.

The play was adapted into different media. A film version, directed by Kon Ichikawa, appeared in 1986, and a TV version in 2008. An opera based on the play by Shin’ichirō Ikebe was premiered by the New National Theatre Tokyo in 2010.

== Plot introduction ==
On 3 November 1886, the Emperor's birthday, a ball is to be held at the Rokumeikan, or Deer Cry Hall, in Tokyo. The guests include many foreign dignitaries. However, anti-government extremists are planning to crash the party.

== Characters ==
- Count Kageyama Hisatoshi, a ruthless figure in the government
- Countess Asako, his wife
- Marchioness Daitokuji Sueko, a friend of Asako
  - her daughter Akiko, who is in love with Hisao
- Kiyohara Einosuke, leader of the dissident Liberals
  - his hostile son Hisao
- Tobita Tenkotsu, an assassin
- Kusano, a maid of the Kageyamas
- General Miyamura and his wife Noriko
- Baron Sakazaki and his wife Sadako
- waiters and servants
- numerous guests
