= Rokumeikan =

Building in Tokyo, Japan (1883–1941)

- Japanese pronunciation: [ɾo.kɯ.meꜜi.kaɴ, -meꜜː-]
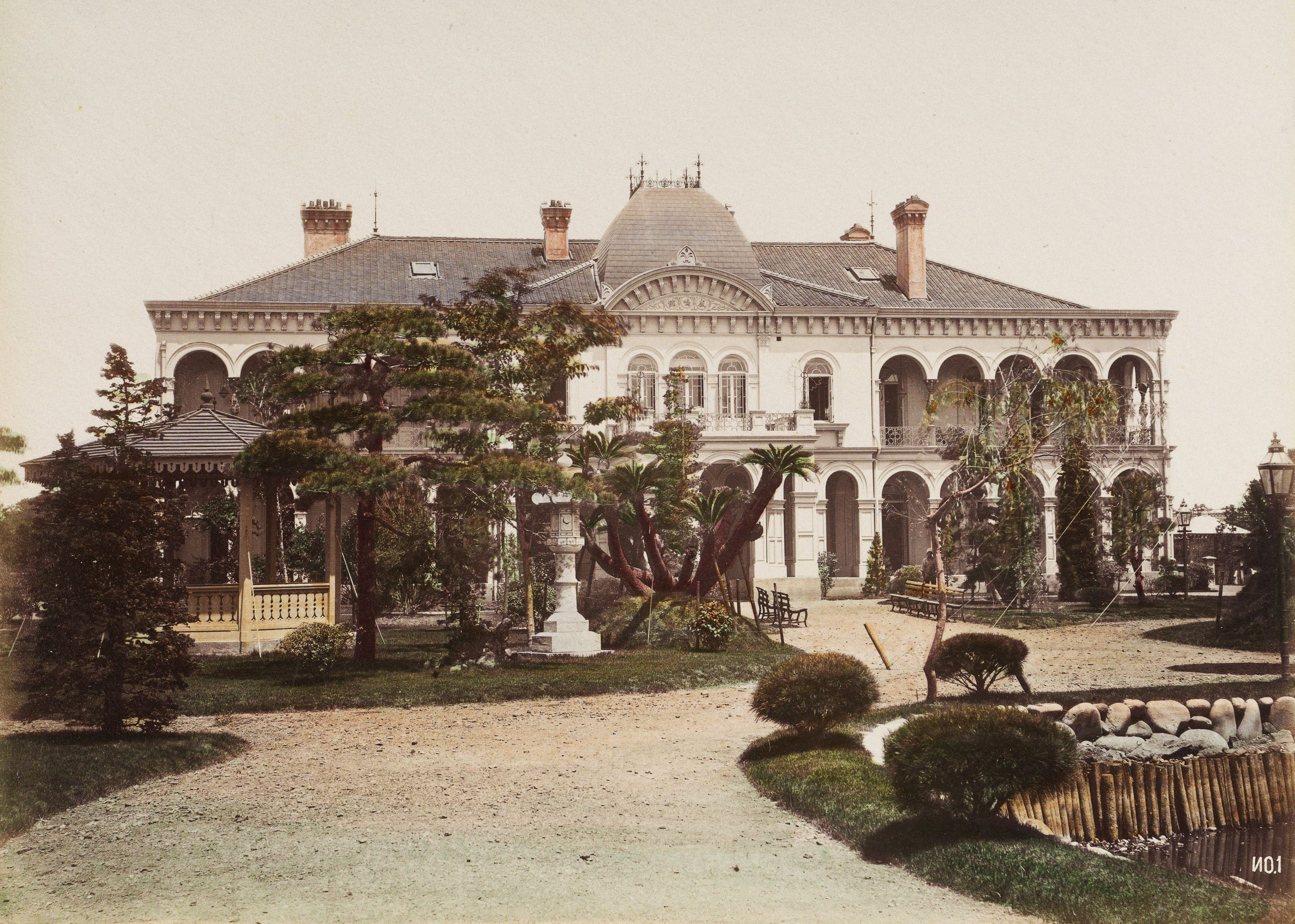
- The Rokumeikan around 1883–1900, Tokyo

General information
- Type: Residence
- Architectural style: French Renaissance
- Location: Chiyoda-ku, Tokyo, 1-1-7, Uchisaiwaicho, Japan
- Coordinates: 35.67194694091169°N 139.75769752532517°E
- Construction started: 1881
- Completed: 1883
- Inaugurated: 28 November 1883
- Demolished: 1941
- Cost: 40,000 yen

Technical details
- Floor count: 2

Design and construction
- Architect: Josiah Conder

The Rokumeikan (鹿鳴館; Japanese pronunciation: [ɾo.kɯ.meꜜi.kaɴ, -meꜜː-]) was a large two-story building in Tokyo, completed in 1883, which became a controversial symbol of Westernisation in the Meiji period. Commissioned for the housing of foreign guests by the Foreign Minister Inoue Kaoru, it was designed by British architect Josiah Conder, a prominent Western adviser working in Japan.

Although the Rokumeikan's heyday was brief, it became famous for its parties and balls, which introduced many high-ranking Japanese to Western manners for the first time, and it is still a fixture in the cultural memory of Japan. It was, however, largely used for the accommodation of guests of the government, and for meetings between Japanese who had already lived abroad.

== History ==
=== Background ===
The site of the Rokumeikan was in Hibiya, near the Imperial Palace on land which had formerly been used as an arsenal for the Satsuma domain. After the Meiji restoration, in 1872 the land became the headquarters of the secretariat charged with preparations for the Vienna Exhibition of 1873. Between July 1875 and October 1881 the land was occupied by the colossal "Yamashita Monnai Museum", a combined zoological and botanical garden, which was then moved to Ueno to make way for the new building and its grounds.

Foreign visitors had previously been housed in the Enryōkan, a building originally erected by the Tokugawa shogunate as part of a training school for naval cadets. Despite attempts at modernization, the older building was ultimately deemed unsatisfactory for housing foreign dignitaries.

=== Construction ===
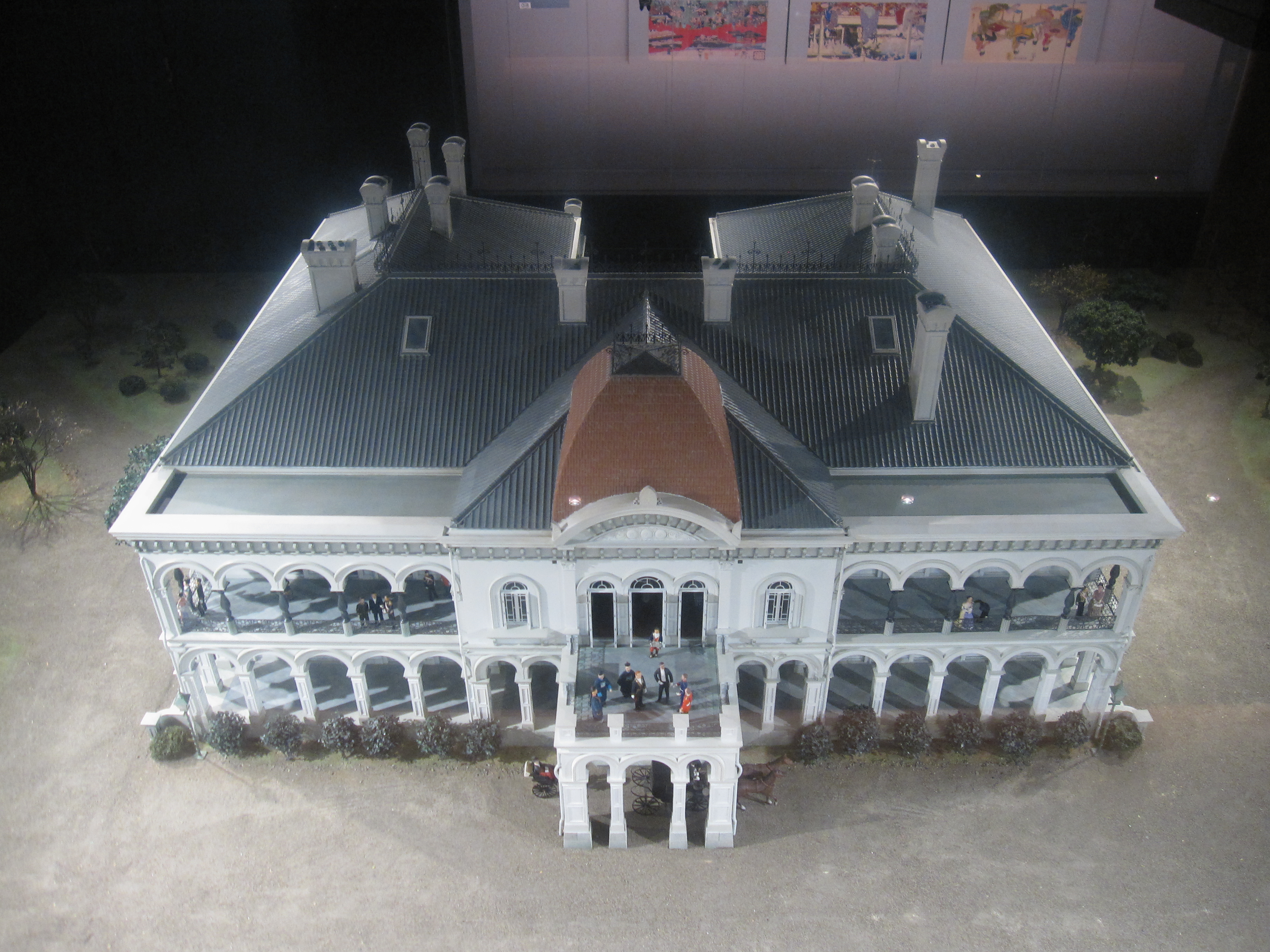
Rokumeikan model (Edo-Tokyo Museum)

Conder received a commission to design a new structure in 1880, and building work started in 1881. Conder borrowed from the French Renaissance style, and used a Mansard roof in his design, which also incorporated an arched portico with columns. However, Conder's wish to put Japanese elements in the design was overruled, although he claimed to have included "pseudo-Saracenic" features. Only the garden, which used pine trees, stone lanterns and ponds, was in the Japanese style.

Difficulties were encountered in construction which caused the original budget of 100,000 yen to expand to 180,000 yen before construction was completed. In contrast, the Foreign Ministry building cost only 40,000 yen to construct. The building was officially opened on 28 November 1883 with a gala to which 1200 guests were invited, including nobles, bureaucrats and foreign diplomats, presided over by Inoue and his wife Takeko.

=== The Rokumeikan era ===
Inoue commissioned the structure as a five-star hotel for European and American diplomats and travelers. He hoped that they would be more inclined to regard Japan as an equal in terms of "civilization" in European minds, which would facilitate renegotiation of the Unequal Treaties, abolition of extraterritoriality and would hasten Japan's entry as an equal in the ranks of the imperial powers.

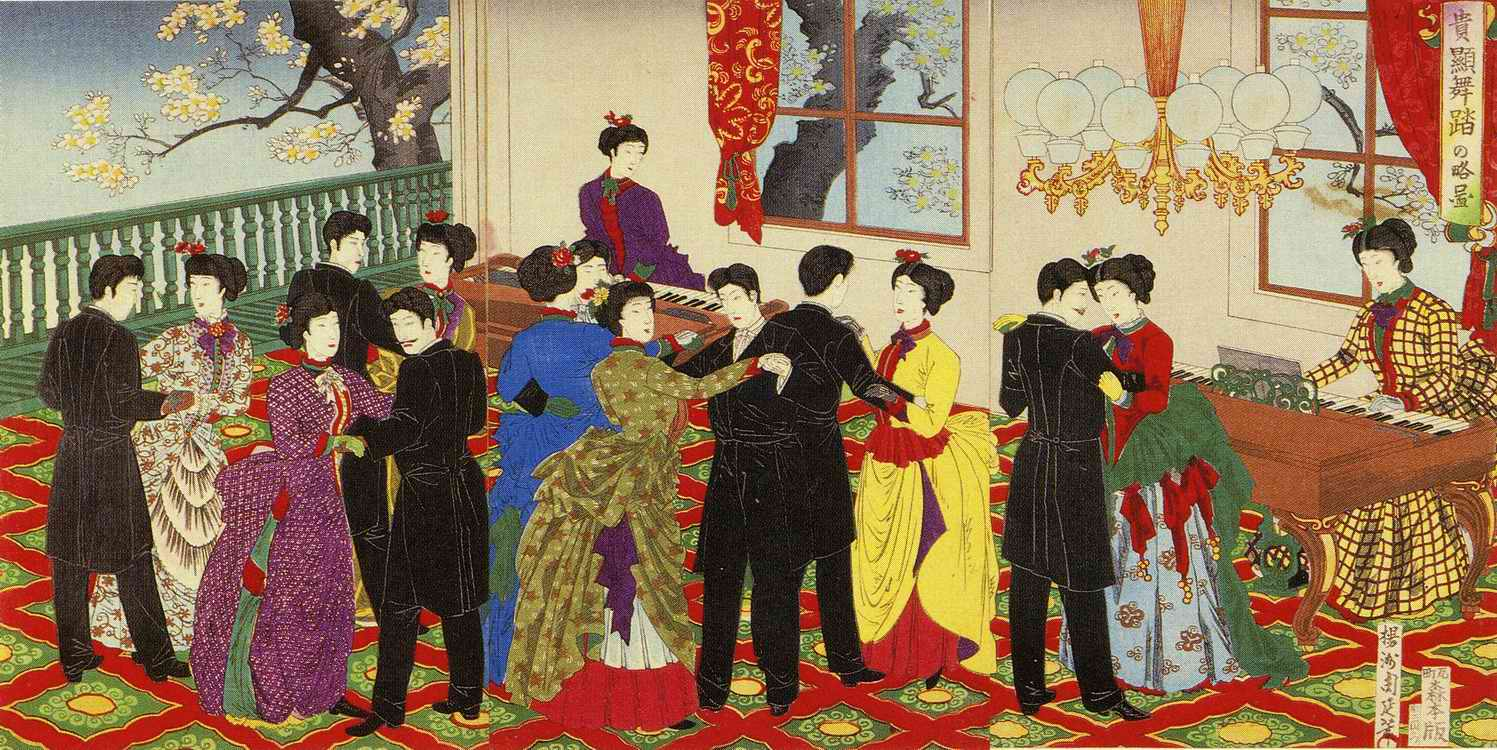
Ukiyoe by Toyohara Chikanobu depicting dancing at the Rokumeikan. The woman playing the piano on the right is thought to be Uryū Shigeko.

The Rokumeikan served elaborate banquets, with menus written in French. In the ballroom, Japanese gentlemen in evening dress imported from tailors in London danced the waltz, polka, quadrille, and mazurka with Japanese ladies dressed in the latest Parisian fashions to the latest European songs played by an Army or Navy band. Foreign residents of Tokyo were hired as dancing tutors.

The results were mixed. Although the highly conspicuous Western building was praised by some visitors, its concept was deplored by many others as tasteless imitation. Pierre Loti, who arrived in Japan in 1886, compared the building (in Japoneries d'Automne, 1889), to a mediocre casino in a French spa town, and the European-style ball to a "monkey show". Likewise, the noted French artist Georges Ferdinand Bigot published a cartoon depicting a stylishly dressed Japanese man and woman admiring themselves in a mirror, but the reflection was that of a pair of monkeys.

Japanese conservatives were outraged by what they perceived to be the degeneration of traditional morals, especially by the close proximity between men and women during dances, and linked rising taxes with the supposed dissipation and self-indulgence of the government. Reports and gossip of scandalous behavior by high-ranking officials (although the most notorious took place at private residences, not at the Rokumeikan), added to the controversy.

The liberal Freedom and People's Rights Movement also criticized the Rokumeikan as expensive, tax-funded deference to Europeans and Americans.

The failure of "Rokumeikan diplomacy" to achieve its desired goal of treaties revised in Japan's favor led eventually to the discrediting of Inoue, who resigned in 1887.

=== Later years ===
In 1890, the Imperial Hotel opened near the Rokumeikan (again with the involvement of Inoue), and was on a grander scale. The opening of the hotel eliminated the need for the Rokumeikan as a residence for foreign visitors. The banquets and balls continued, and the nativist reaction failed to slow the construction of Western-style buildings in Tokyo. But with the increasing westernization of Japan, a growing sense of cultural nationalism, and the eventual elimination of the Unequal Treaties in 1899, the Rokumeikan steadily diminished in importance.

The Rokumeikan building was sold in 1890, to an association of Japan's kazoku peerage. The building was severely damaged in the 1894 Tokyo earthquake, the high cost of repairs contributing to a decline in its use. 1897, Conder was called in to repair the building and make additional alterations. It was used by the Peers' Club (Kazoku Kaikan) for the next few decades.

The building was demolished in 1941. Its destruction disturbed the architect Taniguchi Yoshirō and eventually led him to create the Meiji-mura museum in 1965 for the preservation of Meiji-period buildings.

== Name ==
The name "Rokumeikan" comes from a Chinese classic, the Shi Jing ("Book of Songs"), and refers to the benefits of hospitality. The 161st ode is entitled Lù Míng, 鹿鳴, which is read in Japanese as rokumei. It was chosen by Nakai Hiromu, the first husband of Inoue's wife Takeko.

With pleased sounds the deer call to one another, eating the celery of the fields. [...] I have here admirable guests; whose virtuous fame is grandly brilliant. They show the people not to be mean; the officers have in them a pattern and model.

The name is often translated as "Deer Cry Pavilion", and in older books the translation "Hall of the Baying Stag" is given.

Once purchased by The Peer's Club (group), the building was renamed "The Peer's Club", but also went by the names Nobles' Club and Peerage Club.

== Allusions in literature ==
The Rokumeikan is frequently mentioned in Japanese literature, for example

- Chijin no ai ("Naomi", 1924), a novel by Tanizaki Jun'ichirō
- Butokai ("The Ball", 1920), a short story by Akutagawa Ryūnosuke, retelling Loti's account
- Rokumeikan (1956), a play by Mishima Yukio, and based on it
  - Rokumeikan (1986), a film
  - Rokumeikan (2008), a television special starring Masakazu Tamura and Hitomi Kuroki
- Lady Snowblood, a manga written by Kazuo Koike (chapter 5 of the first volume: "Rokumeikan Murder Panorama")
- Aoi Hana, a manga written by Takako Shimura who the characters act out the play Rokumeikan

The Roumeikan is mentioned in The Watchmaker of Filigree Street by Natasha Pulley.

== Location ==
The site of the Rokumeikan is in Chiyoda-ku, Uchisaiwaichō 1-chome. A commemorative plaque is located in front of the NBF Hibiya Building (formerly the Yamato Life Insurance Company).
