= Josiah Conder (architect) =

British architect (1852–1920)

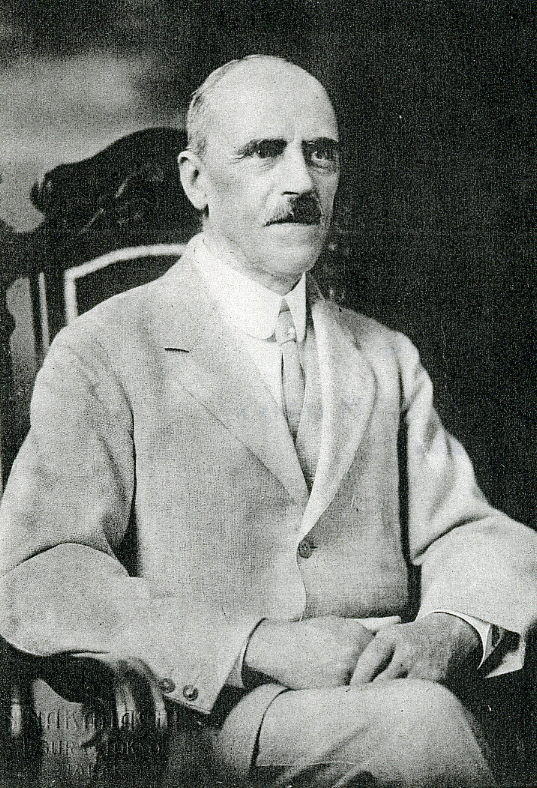
- Josiah Conder
- Born: 28 September 1852; London, England
- Died: 21 June 1920 (aged 67); Tokyo, Japan
- Education: University of London
- Occupation: Architect
- Awards: Order of the Sacred Treasures
- Buildings: Rokumeikan

Josiah Conder (28 September 1852 – 21 June 1920) was a British-French architect who was hired by the Meiji Japanese government as a professor of architecture for the Imperial College of Engineering and became architect of Japan's Public Works. He started his own practice after 1888.

Conder designed numerous public buildings in Tokyo, including the Rokumeikan, which became a controversial symbol of Westernisation in the Meiji period. He educated young Japanese architects, notably Tatsuno Kingo and Katayama Tōkuma, earning him the nickname "father of Japanese modern architecture."

== Early career ==
Conder was born in Brixton, Surrey, London, to Josiah Conder, a banker, and his wife, Elizabeth (Willsher). Conder was educated at Bedford Modern School, and then became an architect pupil with Thomas Roger Smith. He later studied architecture at the South Kensington School of Art and the University of London.

His grandfather, Josiah Conder (1789–1855) was a well known religious bookseller and author, mostly known for his book The Modern Traveller. His uncle, Francis Roubiliac Conder (1815–1889), was a successful civil engineer in railway construction. Francis Roubiliac's son, Claude Reignier Conder, became a Royal Engineer after graduating from the University of London and the Royal Military Academy, Woolwich. He made extensive geographical and archaeological surveys over the Middle East at the end of the 19th century.

Conder worked for the Gothic Revival architect William Burges for two years. In 1876 he was awarded the Soane Medal.

== Career in Japan ==
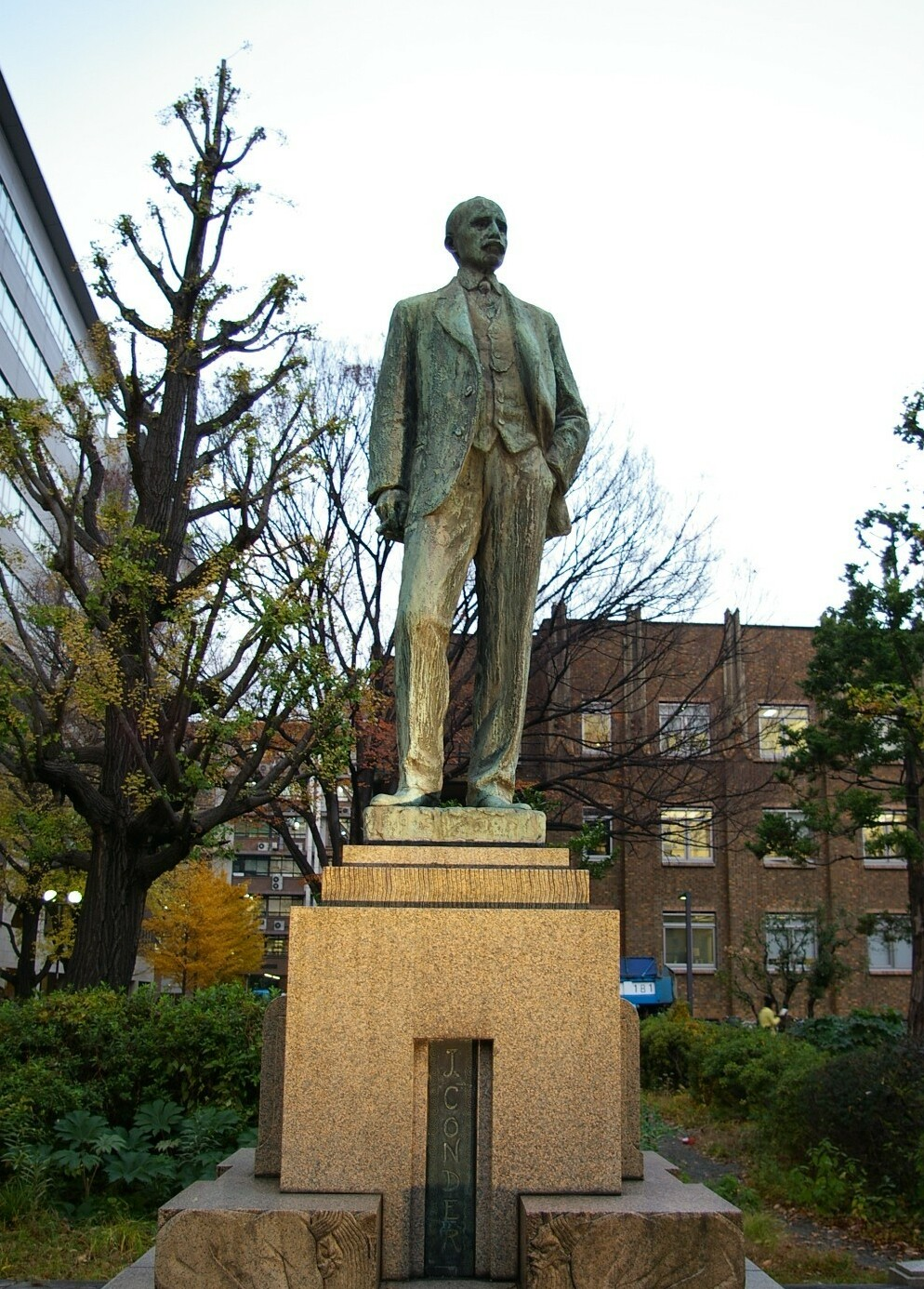
Statue of Josiah Conder on the campus of University of Tokyo

Conder was surely interested in the Orient through his relatives' works, in particular of Claude Reignier Conder, but it is unknown how he was appointed as professor for the Imperial College of Engineering, Tokyo.

The Imperial College of Engineering started teaching in October 1873 by British instructors led by a principal Henry Dyer, who was looking for an architect-professor in the Department of Architecture. Charles Alfred Chastel de Boinville had been an architect of Japan's Public Works since 1873 and built the main building of the College.

Conder arrived in Tokyo in January 1877 and quickly established a reputation as a dedicated and highly skilled teacher. The Calendar of the College was prepared by its principal, Henry Dyer, a 6 year programme, consisting of a basic course, technical course and practice course, 2 years for each. Conder taught both technical subjects and practice including design theory, architectural history, drawing, technical draftsmanship. Most graduates played essential roles in the development of modern Japan's architecture, including Tatsuno Kingo, Katayama Tōkuma, Sone Tatsuzō and Satachi Shichijirō. Yorinaka Tsumaki and Shimoda Kikutaro, who left the Imperial College of Engineering before graduation, also became successful architects.

Conder taught history of oriental architecture using James Fergusson's works which insisted that there was no substantial architecture in the Orient except Mughal architecture, a kind of Saracenic architecture. Conder believed Saracenic based style might be suitable for modern Japan, and utilized it as Pseudo-Saracenic style for his early works including the Tokyo Imperial Museum, the retail shop of the Hokkaido Development Authority and the Rokumeikan. This style was limitedly accepted by Tatsuno Kingo for his design of the Kokugi-Kan (National Sumo Wrestling Hall), and Conder was very disappointed that most of his students did not understand his intention.

Conder was charged with transforming the Marunouchi area into a London-style business district by the Ministry of Industry on a five-year contract. Despite residing in Japan, he kept up a professional affiliation with the Royal Institute of British Architects, becoming an Associate in 1874 and a Fellow in 1884. He became a part-time lecturer until he set up his own practice in 1888. Some of his former students set up the Architectural Institute of Japan and made Conder its first honorary president. He was awarded the Order of the Sacred Treasures (3rd class) in 1894.

Conder developed a keen interest in Japanese arts and after a long period of petitioning, was finally accepted to study painting with the artist Kawanabe Kyōsai. Kyōsai dubbed Conder Kyōei (暁英), incorporating the character ei (英) from the Japanese name for Britain. Conder also studied Enshu school ikebana. His studies led to a number of publications, among them "The Flowers of Japan and The Art of Floral Arrangement" (1891), "Landscape Gardening in Japan" (1893) and "Paintings and Studies by Kawanabe Kyosai" (1911). He wrote the first after a lecture at the Asiatic Society of Japan.

In 1915, the Tokyo Imperial University awarded Conder an honorary doctorate. He remained in Japan for the rest of his life. His grave is at the temple of Gokoku-ji in Bunkyo, Tokyo.

== Notable buildings ==
Conder's architectural designs incorporated a wide variety of styles, including European and colonial elements. Although he designed over fifty buildings during his career in Japan, many no longer exist.

Notable buildings surviving today are the residence of Iwasaki Yanosuke, founder of the Mitsubishi group in Yushima (1896, now the Kyu-Iwasaki-tei Garden) and the Mitsui Club in Mita, Tokyo (1913).

- Kummo-in school for the blind (1879)
- Ueno Imperial Museum, Tokyo (1881)
- Rokumeikan, Tokyo (1883)
- University of Tokyo's faculty of law and literature building, Hongo, Tokyo (1884)
- Iwasaki Villa, Fukagawa, Tokyo (1889); Burnt down by 1923 Great Kantō earthquake
- Holy Resurrection Cathedral (or Nikorai-do, 1891)
- Ministry of the Navy Building, Kasumigaseki, Tokyo (1895)
- St. Barnabas' Church, Ushigome, Tokyo (1897) (subsequently enlarged by Conder and reopened in 1907)
- Christ Church, Yokohama (1901), second church building at Yamate Bluff. (Destroyed in 1923 Great Kantō earthquake).
- Seisen University Main Hall (1915)
- Furukawa Toranosuke Villa, now Kyu-Furukawa Gardens, Tokyo (1917)

== Gallery ==
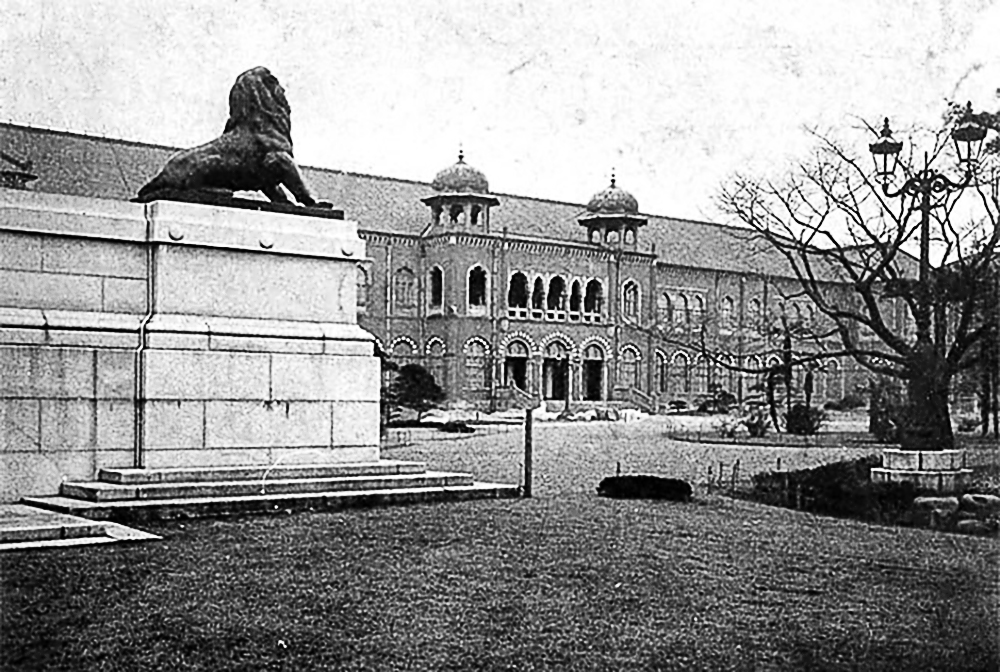
Tokyo Imperial Household Museum

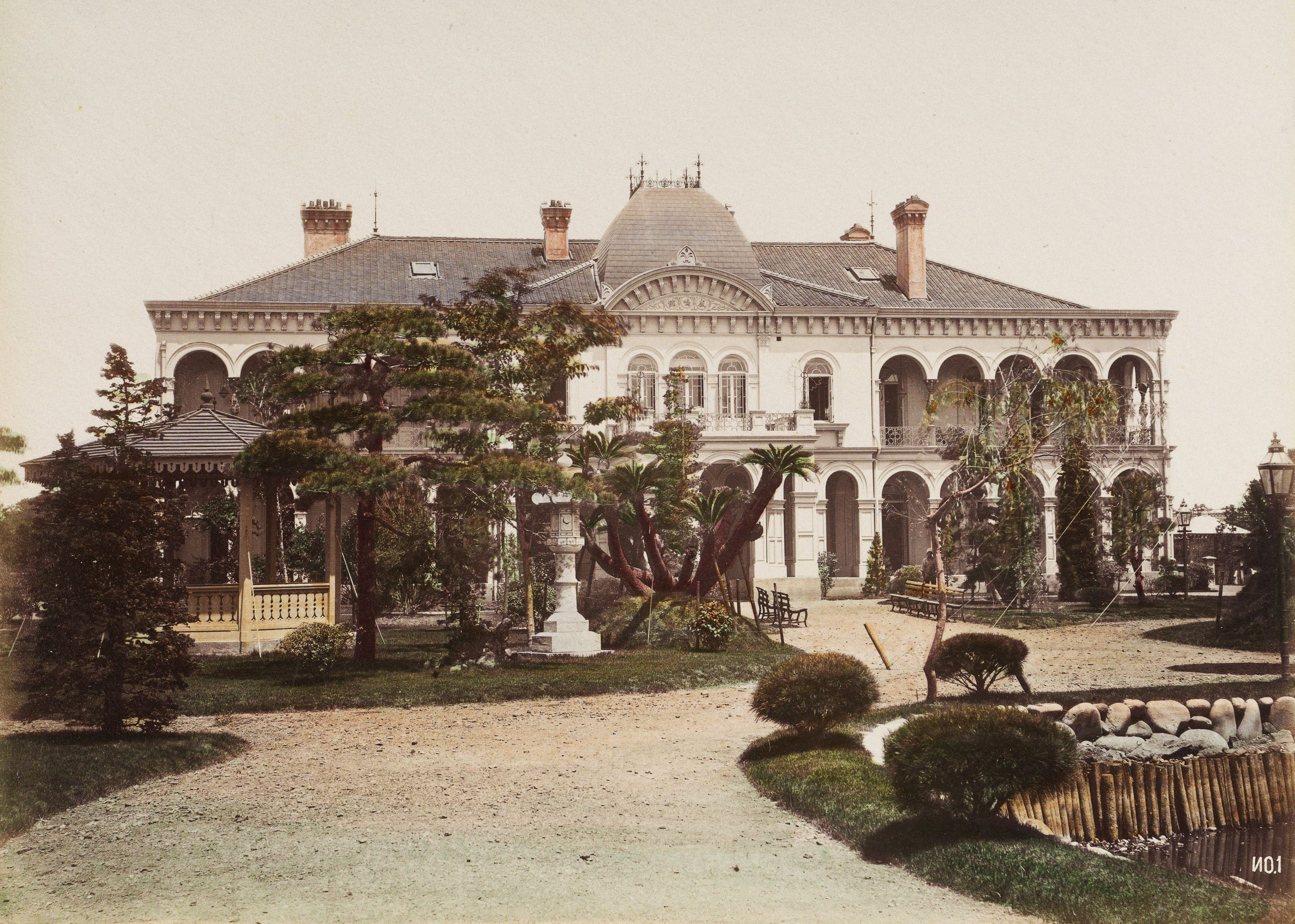
Rokumeikan (1883)

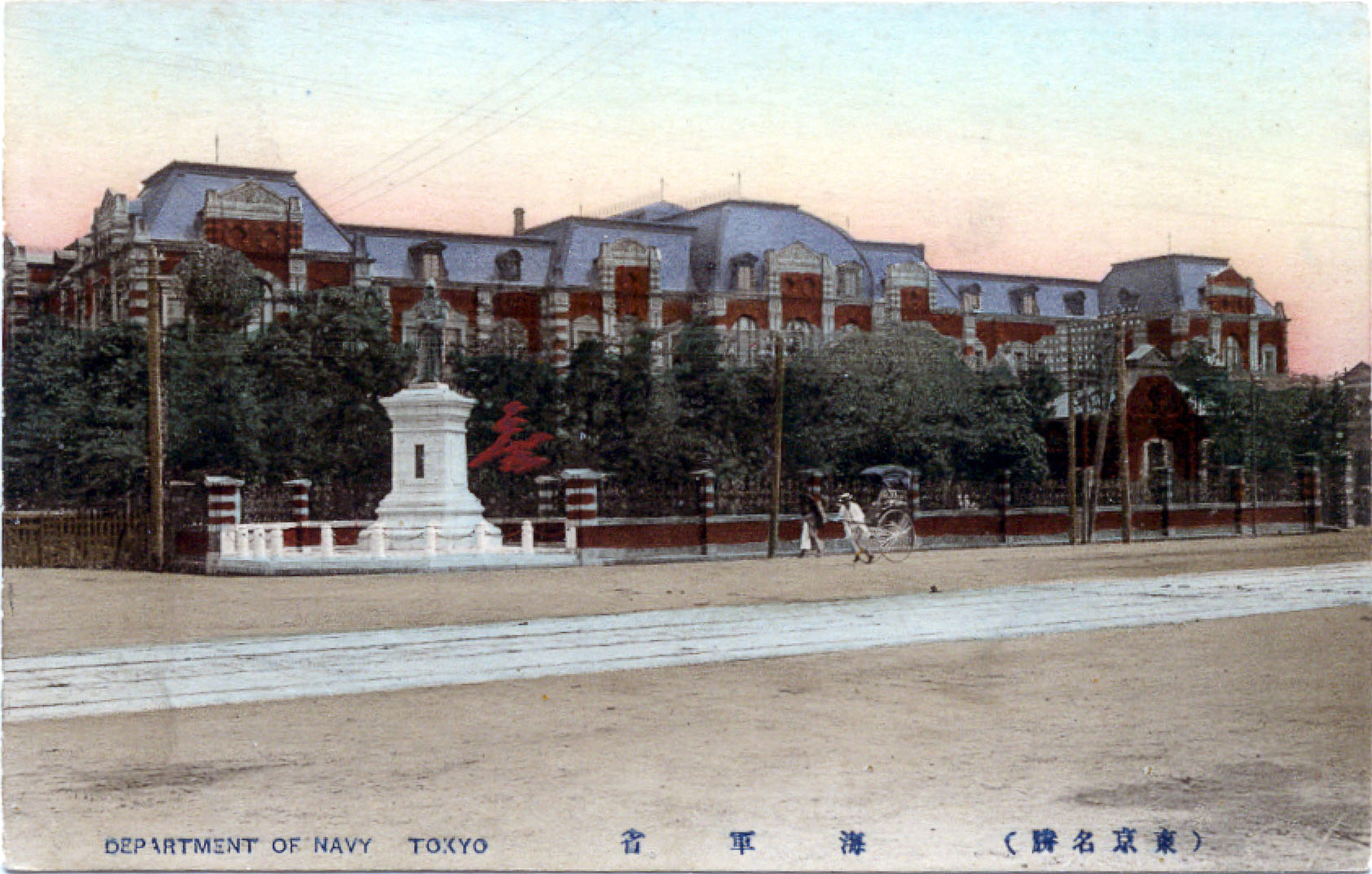
Ministry of the Navy Building, Tokyo

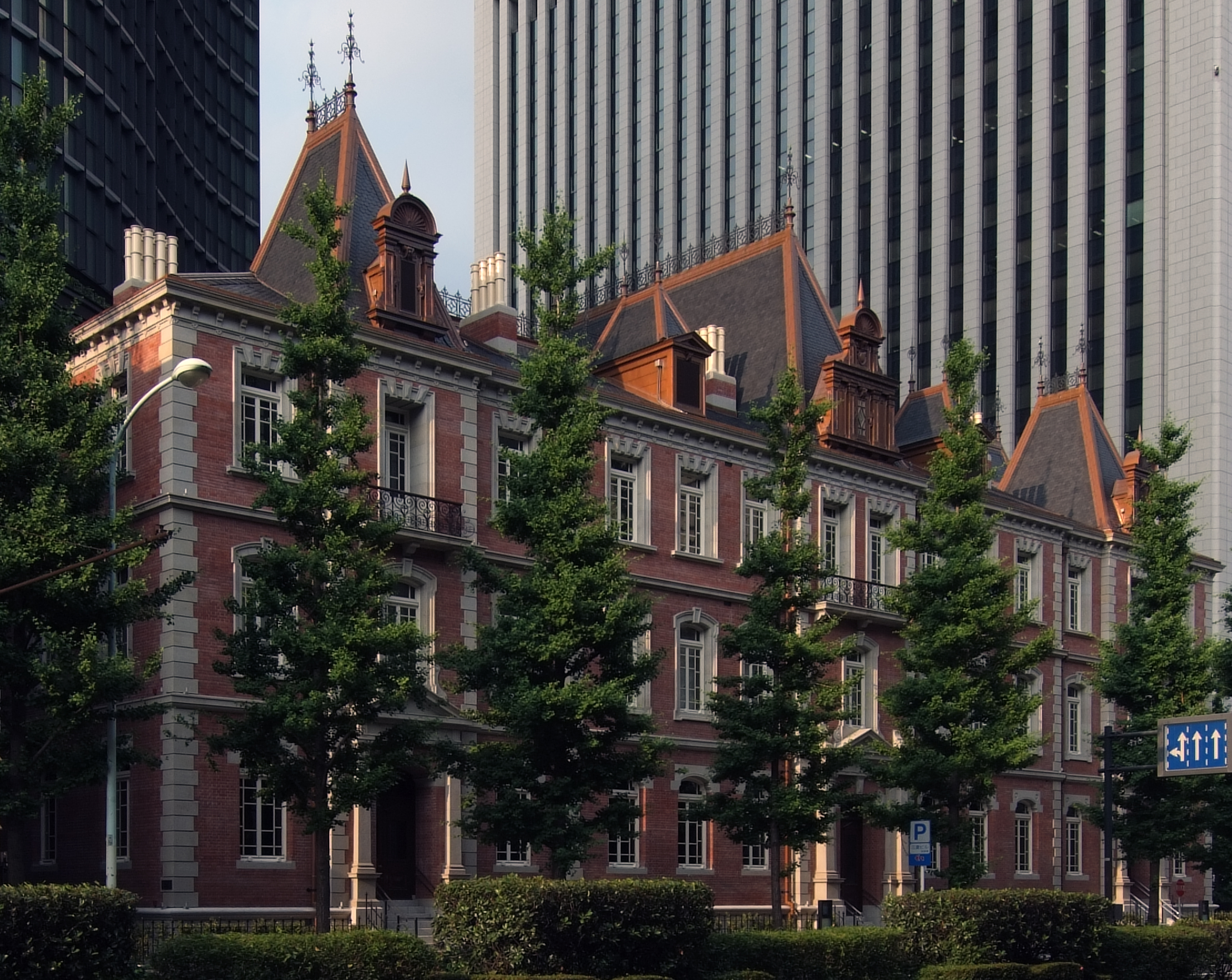
Mitsubishi Office Building No. 1, Tokyo

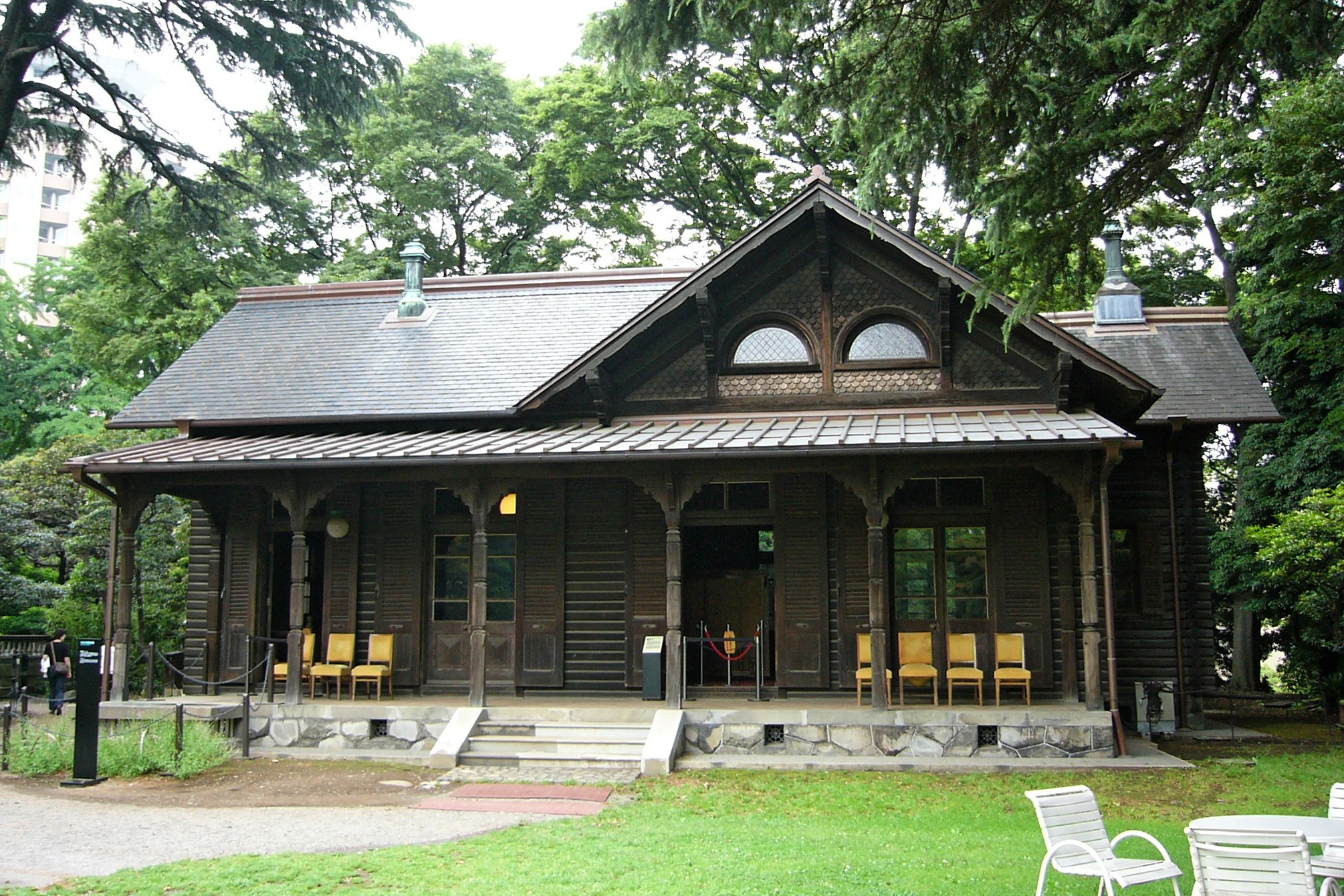
Iwasaki Billiards House

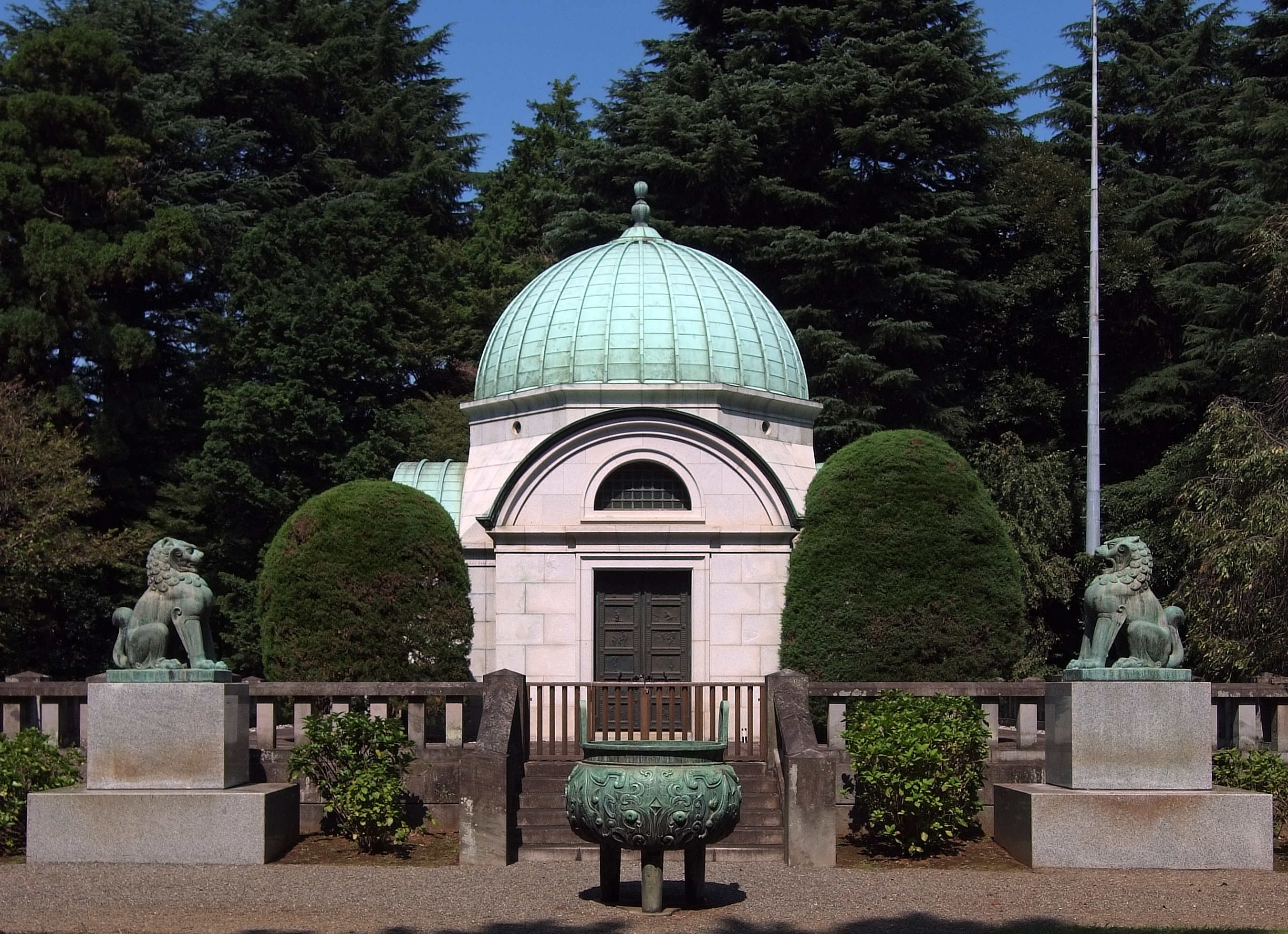
Mausoleum of Yanosuke Iwasaki's Family

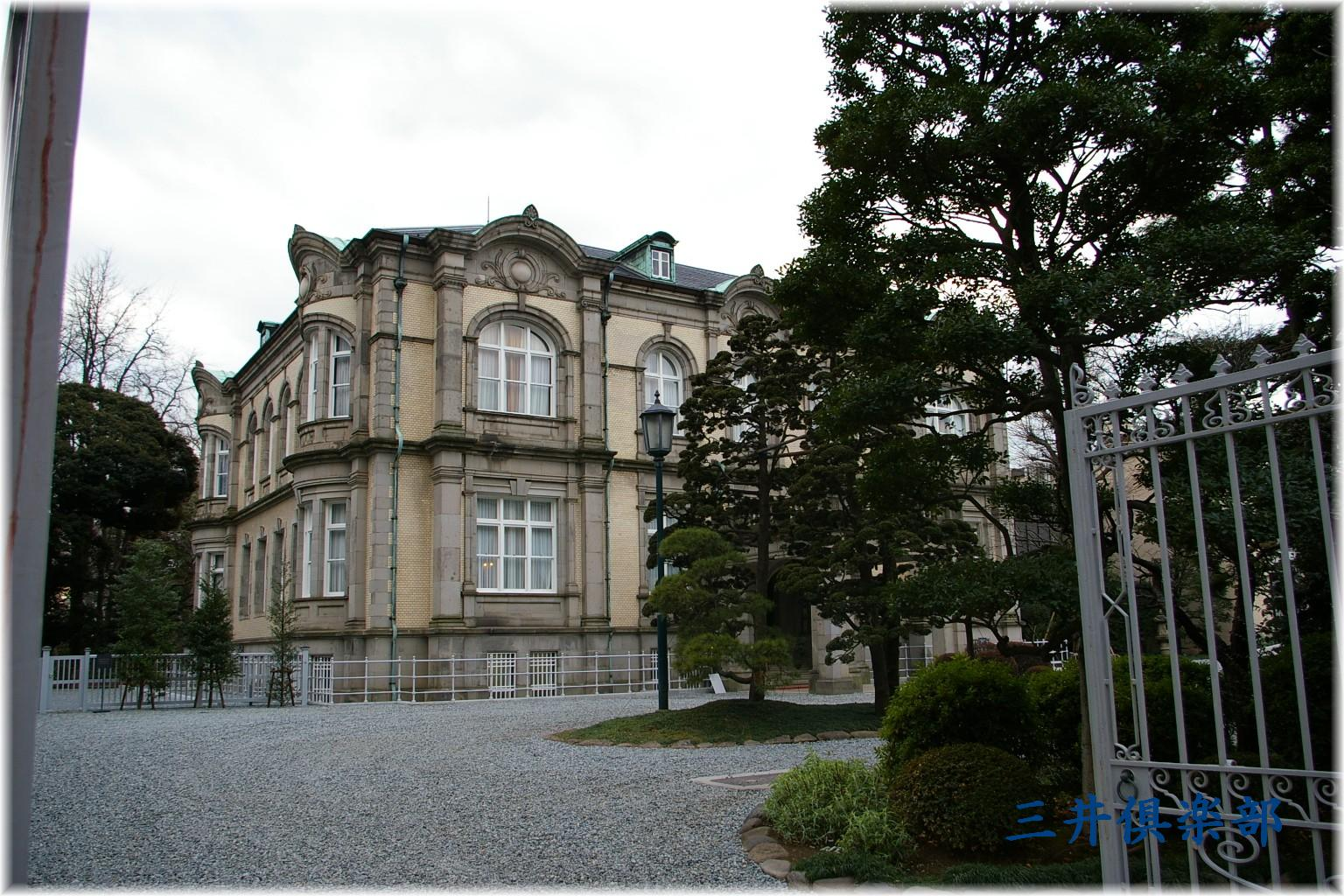
Tsunamachi Mitsui Club

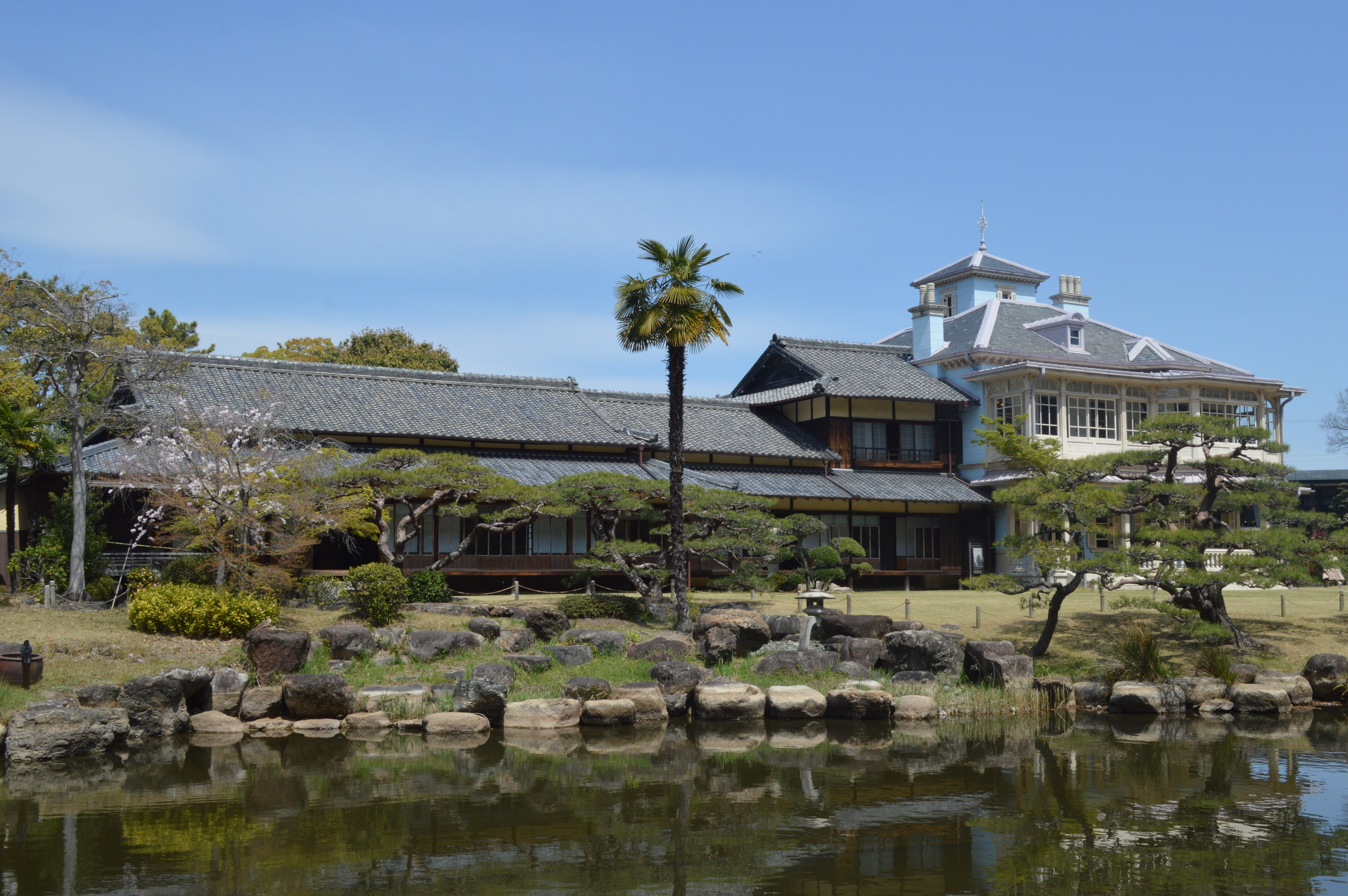
Rokkaen (Moroto Seiroku Mansion)

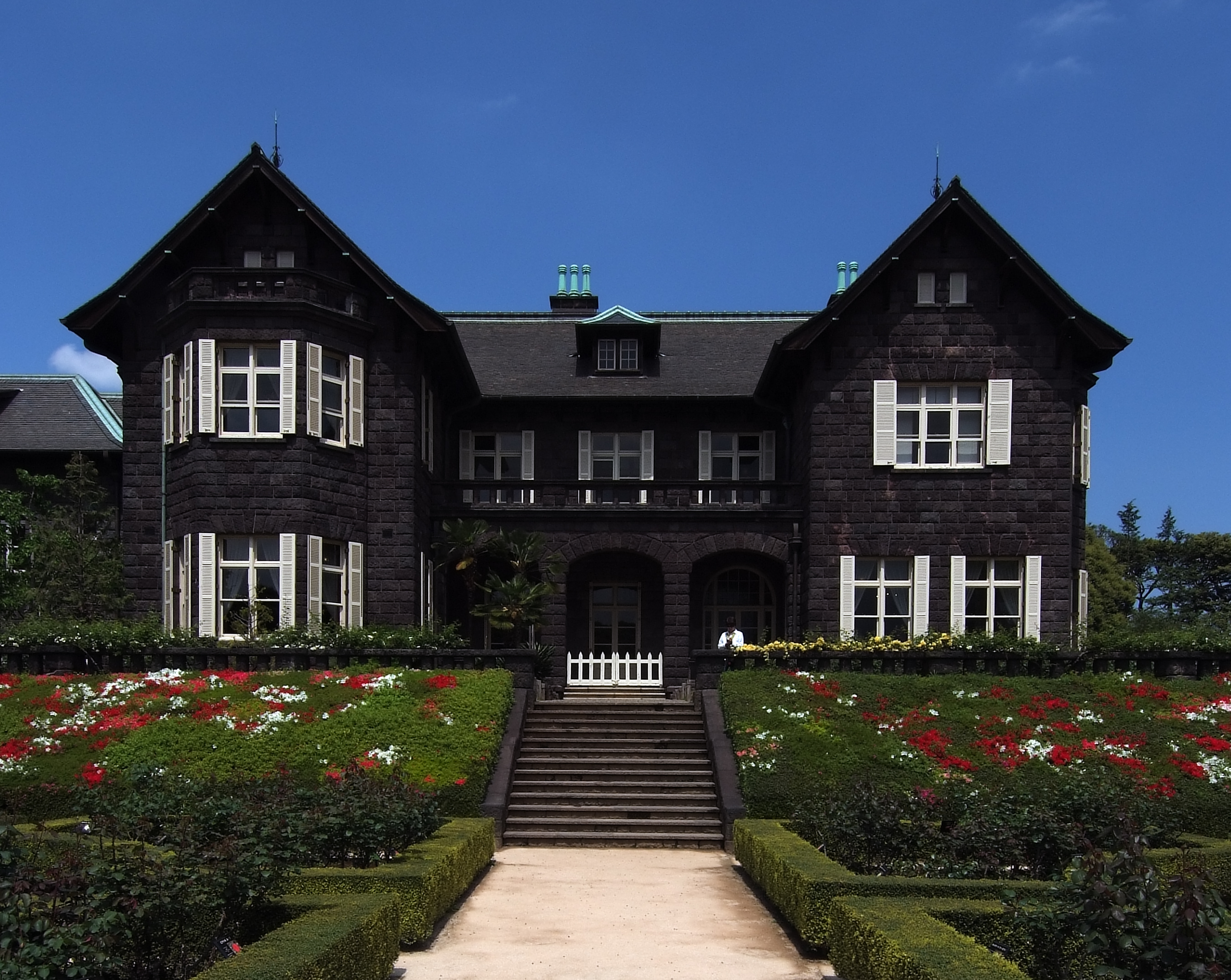
Old Furukawa Mansion

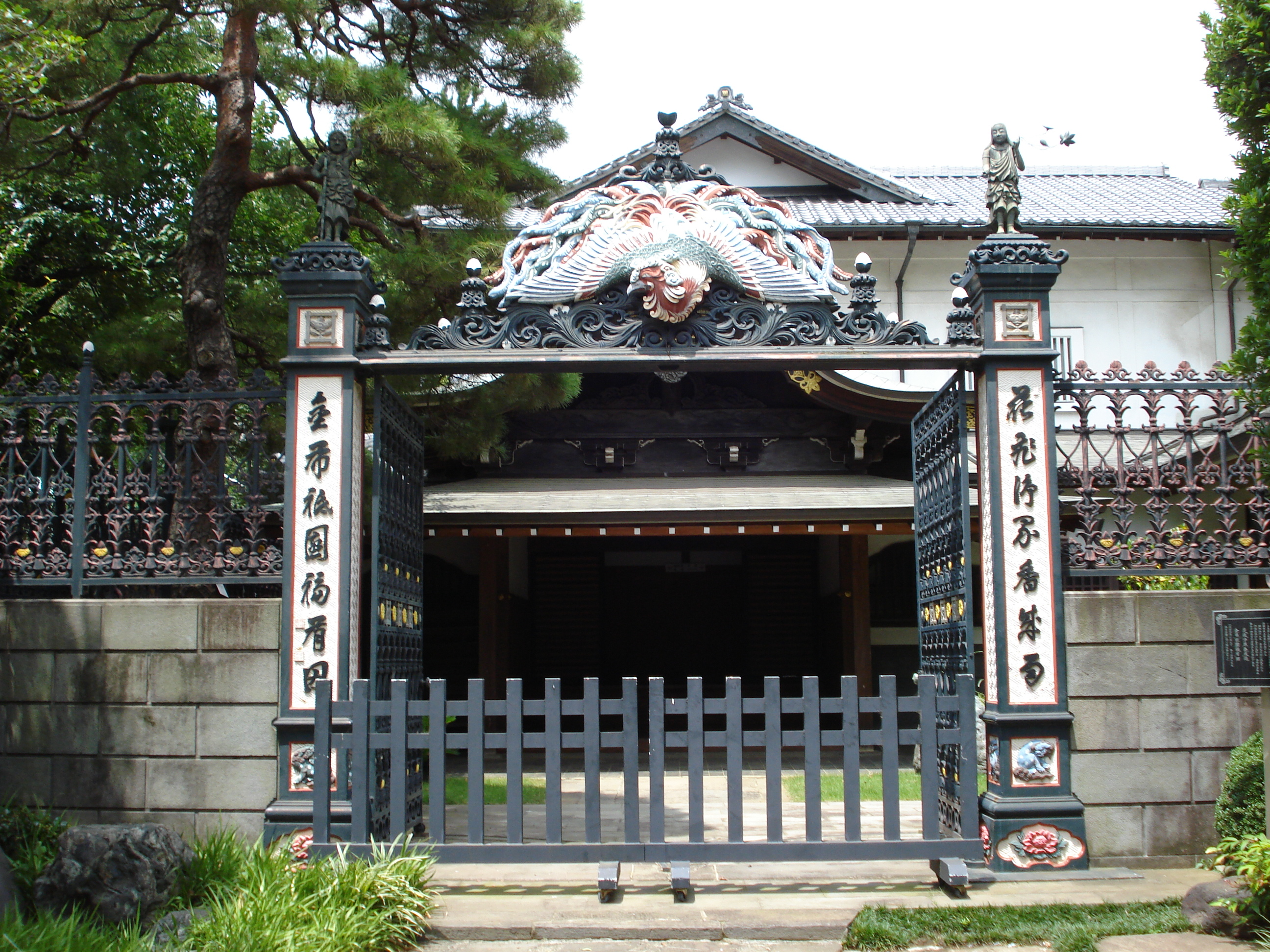
Myouhouji Tetsumon Gate

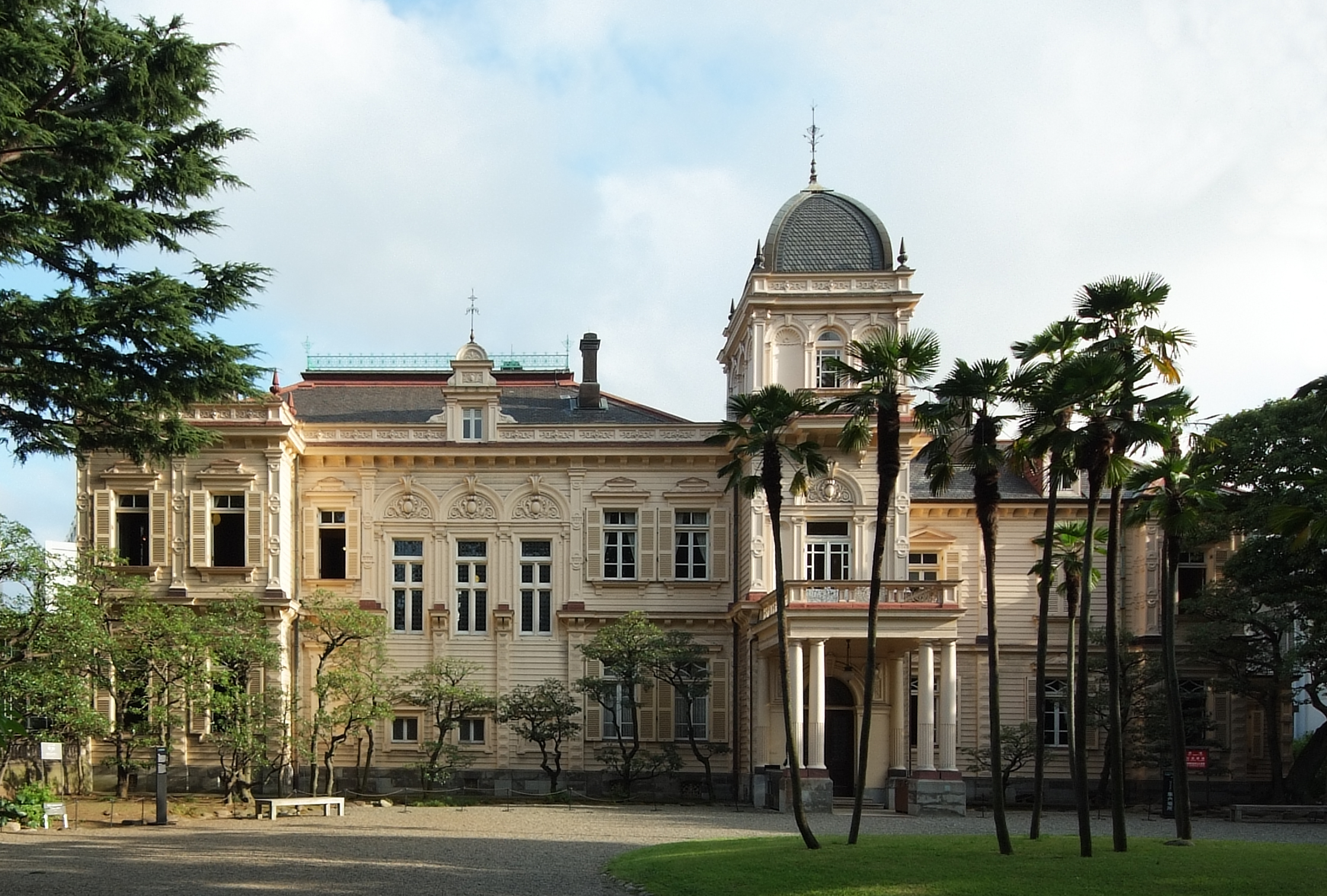
Former Iwasaki Mansion (1896)

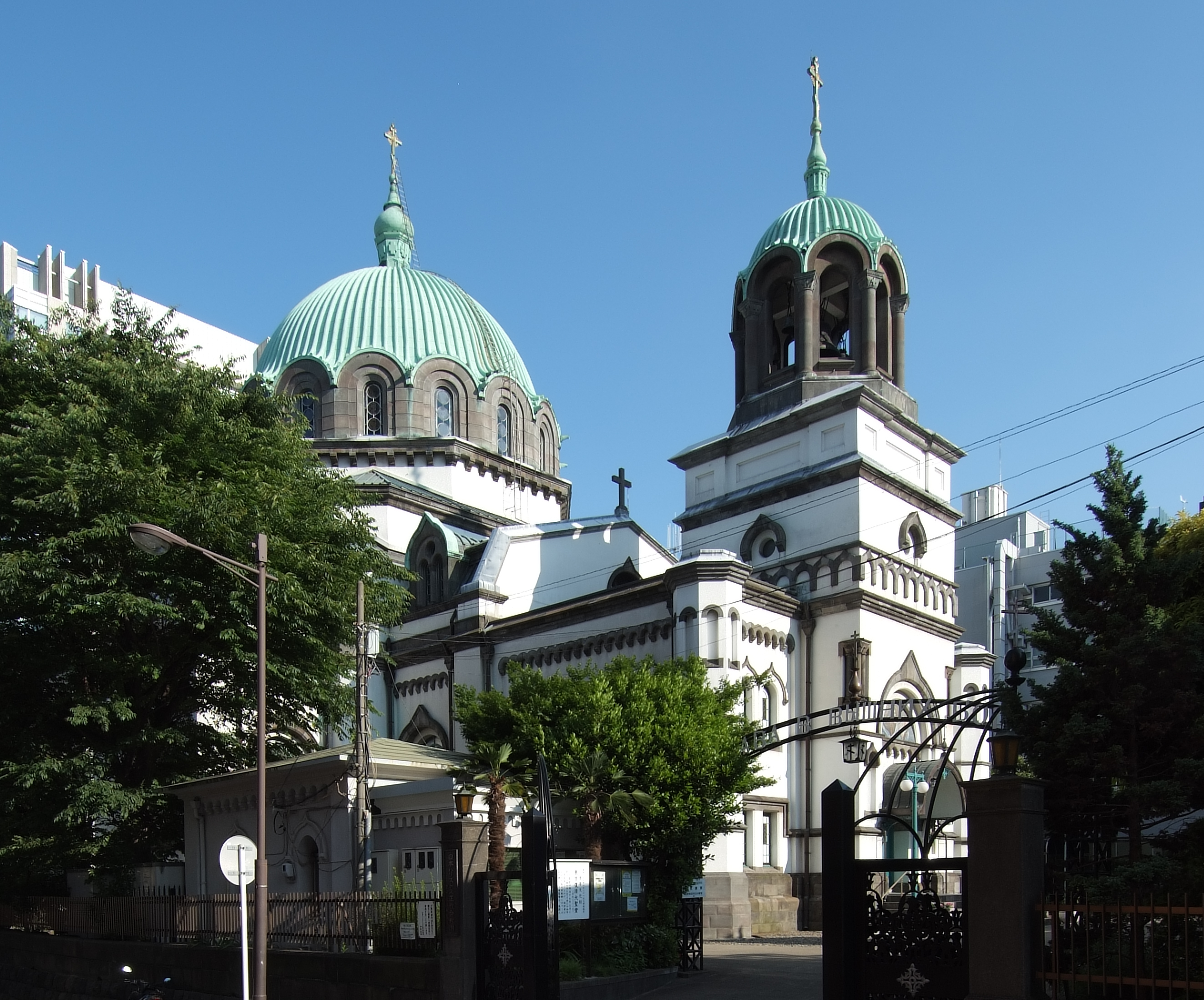
Tokyo Resurrection Cathedral

== See also ==
- British–Japanese relations
