= Tatsuno Kingo =

Japanese architect (1854-1919)

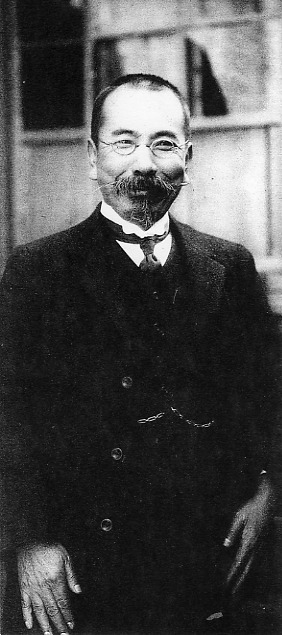
- Tatsuno Kingo
- Born: 13 October 1854; Karatsu, Saga Prefecture, Japan
- Died: 25 March 1919 (aged 64); Tokyo, Japan
- Education: Imperial College of Engineering, University of London
- Occupation: Architect
- Spouse: Hisako Tatsuno
- Children: Yutaka Tatsuno (Scholar of French literature, writer)
- Buildings: Tokyo Station (1914)

Tatsuno Kingo (辰野 金吾; October 13, 1854 – 25 March 1919) was a Japanese architect born in Karatsu, Saga Prefecture, Kyushu. He was a Doctor of Engineering; conferred as Jusanmi (従三位, Junior Third Rank) and Kunsanto (勲三等, Order of Third Class); and served as dean of Architecture Department at Tokyo Imperial University.

Tatsuno is most widely known for his work as the designer of the Bank of Japan building (1896) and the Marunouchi building of Tokyo Station (1914).

== Education and early career ==
Tatsuno studied architecture at the Imperial College of Engineering where he was a student of the influential British architect Josiah Conder, who was often called "father of Japanese modern architecture". After graduating in 1879, Tatsuno journeyed to London in 1880 attending courses at the University of London. During his stay he worked at the architectural offices of the Gothic Revivalist William Burges. Burges died in 1881 during Tatsuno's stay, but before returning to Japan Tatsuno also took the opportunity to travel extensively in France and Italy.

On his return to Tokyo, Tatsuno taught first at the Imperial College of Engineering before becoming department head at University of Tokyo.

In 1886, he was one of the founders of the forerunner of the Architectural Institute of Japan, which was then called the "Building Institute". The organisation was based upon the Royal Institute of British Architects and the group met regularly, sponsored lectures and produced Japan's first architectural journal.

Tatsuno Kingo (金吾) was nicknamed Tatsuno Kengo (from the Japanese word 堅固 meaning firmness) because his designs and layouts were considered solid and strong.

== Later career ==
Although his early work was influenced by his travels in Europe, with traces of Inigo Jones and Christopher Wren, the Shibusawa Mansion (1888) was influenced by Serlio, Ruskin and Conder's own Venetian styled works. The site, on one of Tokyo's canalways suited itself to a Venetian character.

=== Bank of Japan ===
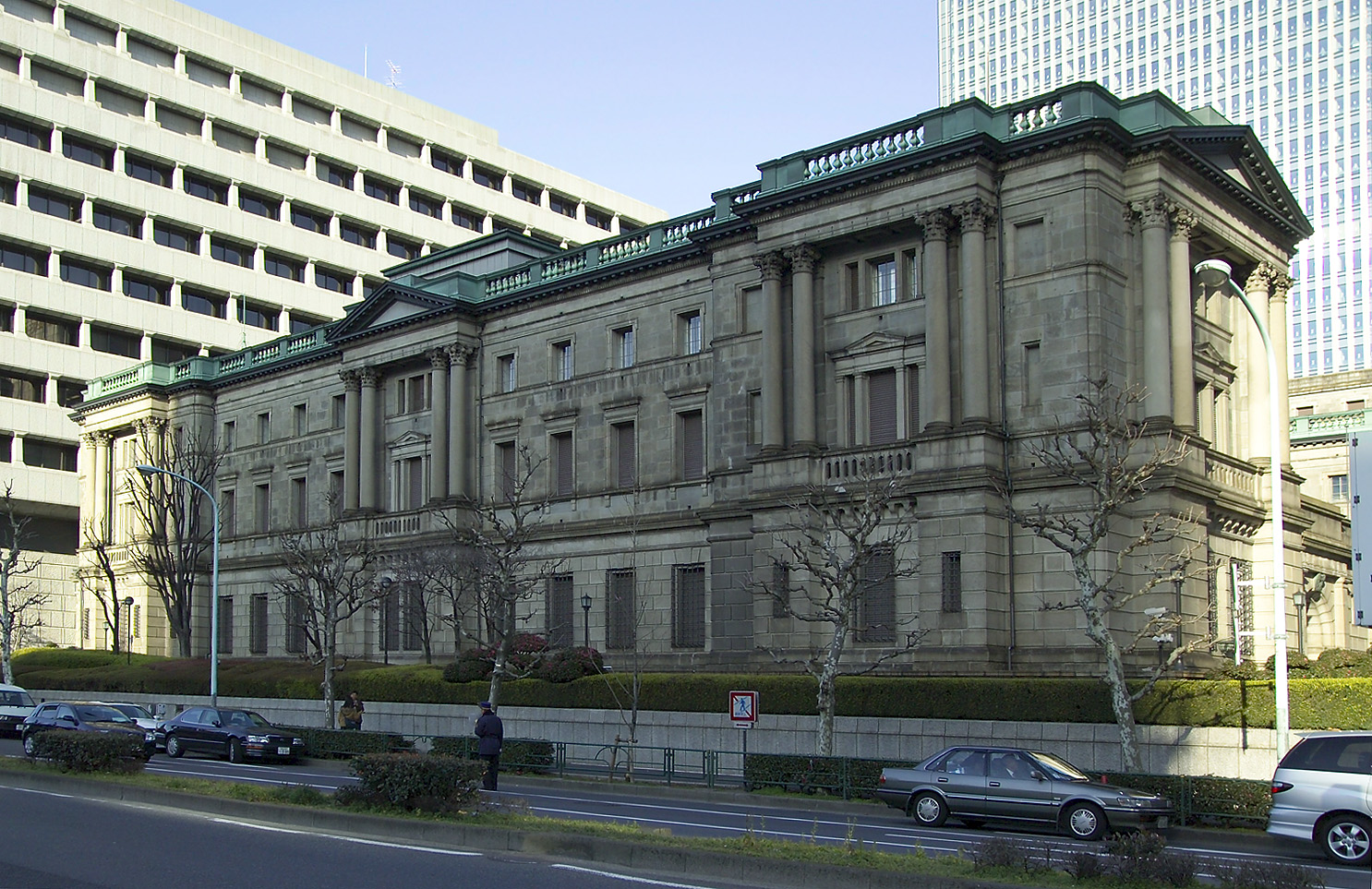
Bank of Japan building (Tokyo)

Tatsuno's connection with Shibusawa Eiichi brought him the commission to design the head office of the Bank of Japan in 1890 (completed in 1896). It was the first building of its type to be designed by a native Japanese person. Tatsuno immediately set off to Europe for a year to do research for the project, studying amongst other buildings, the Banque Nationale in Brussels by Beyaert and Janssens.

The bank is a three-storey building constructed with reinforced brick faced with stone and has limited use of steel for long spans. Its style displays Neo-Baroque architectural influences. echoing European central bank buildings of the period. The original building was square in plan with the banking hall situated immediately behind the porticoed main front.

Tatsuno not only designed the Tokyo Head Office of the Bank of Japan, but was also responsible for designing the Bank of Japan's branch offices in Osaka, Kyoto, Nagoya, Kanazawa, Hakodate, Morioka and Hiroshima. Almost two thirds of the 140 buildings that Tatsuno was associated with in his career were to be bank buildings.

=== Tokyo Station ===
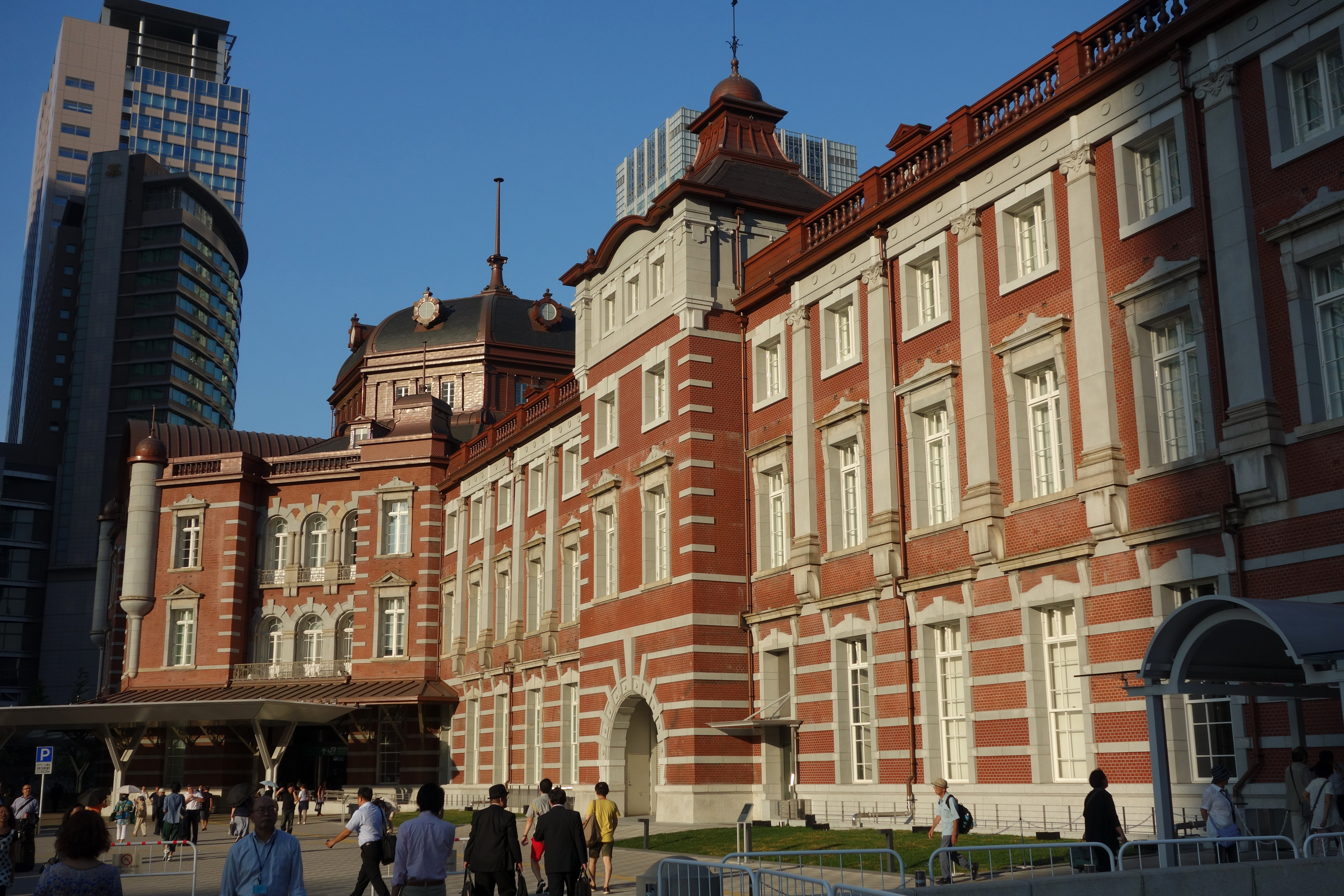
Exterior Tokyo Station

Other than the Bank of Japan building, the structure most closely associated with Tatsuno in the later stages of his career is undoubtedly the Marunouchi facing side of Tokyo Station. The broadly Neo-Baroque design completed in 1914 is distinctive for its use of extensive steel framing and red brick with ribbed domes crowning the north and south wings of the structure. Much of the original steel framing was imported from England and the sturdiness of the design enabled the structure to survive both the Great Kantō earthquake in 1923 as well as wartime bombing and fires in 1945. A sympathetic 5-year renovation of the 1914 structure was completed in October 2012, restoring the domed roof structures that had been a feature of Tatsuno's original design.

Tatsuno also had a strong influence on Japanese colonial architecture, especially in Manchukuo. His connection with construction companies such as Okada Engineering, the Architectural Institute of Japan, or through the new Journal of Manchurian Architecture (Manshu kenchiku zasshi 満州建築雑誌), helped insure that a particular architectural style — that popularized by Tatsuno, sometimes called the Tatsuno style (辰野式)— initially became the standard throughout Japanese Manchuria. This involved a somewhat grand interpretation of the style of historical eclecticism that was popular in contemporary Europe.

In 1903 Tatsuno set up his own architectural office, the first Japanese architect in the country to do so. He died as a result of the 1918 flu pandemic in 1919.

== Notable buildings ==
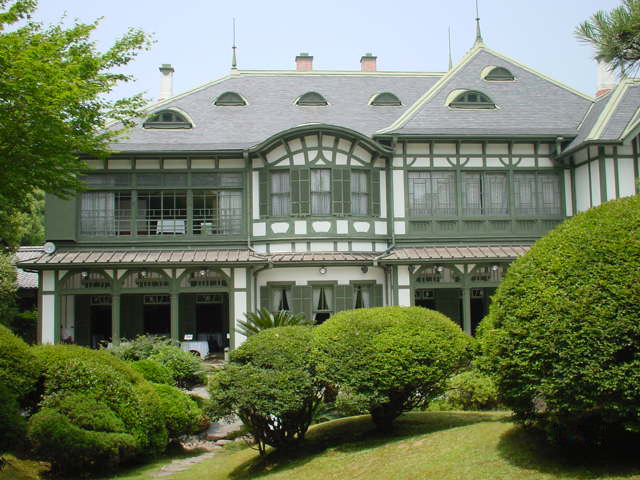
The western style part of the West Japan Industrial Club (Former Matsumoto Residence)

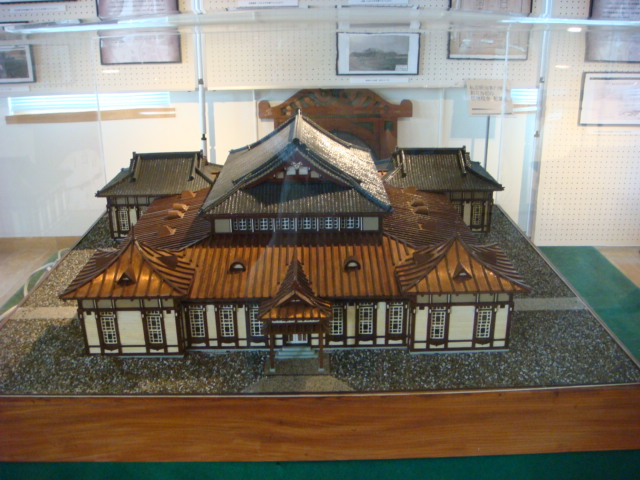
Scale model of the first school building of Kyushu Institute of Technology in the Tobata campus archives

- Bankers' Association Assembly Rooms, Sakamoto-cho, Tokyo (1885)
- Shibusawa Mansion, Kabutocho, Tokyo (1888)
- College of Engineering, Tokyo Imperial University, Hongo (1888)
- Hamaderakōen Station, Sakai, Osaka Prefecture (1908)
- The first school building of Kyushu Institute of Technology (1909)
- National Sumo Arena, Kuramae, Tokyo (1909)
- Nara Hotel, Nara (1909)
- The West Japan Industrial Club, Tobata, Kitakyushu (1911)
- Bank of Chōsen, Seoul (1912)
- Old Yasuda Mail Products, Yahatahigashi-ku, Kitakyushu (1912)
- Manseibashi Station, Tokyo (1912)
- Amami Onsen Nanten-en Ryokan, Osaka (1914)
- Old Hyaku-Sanju Bank Yawata Branch, Yahatahigashi-hu, Kitakyushu (1915)
- Old San-yo Hotel, Kokutestu, Shimonoseki (1923)

== Honors ==
On 14 May 2021, 136795 Tatsunokingo, a sizable near-Earth object and potentially hazardous asteroid which was discovered by astronomer Takashi Hasegawa at Kiso Observatory in 1997, was named by the Working Group for Small Bodies Nomenclature in his memory.

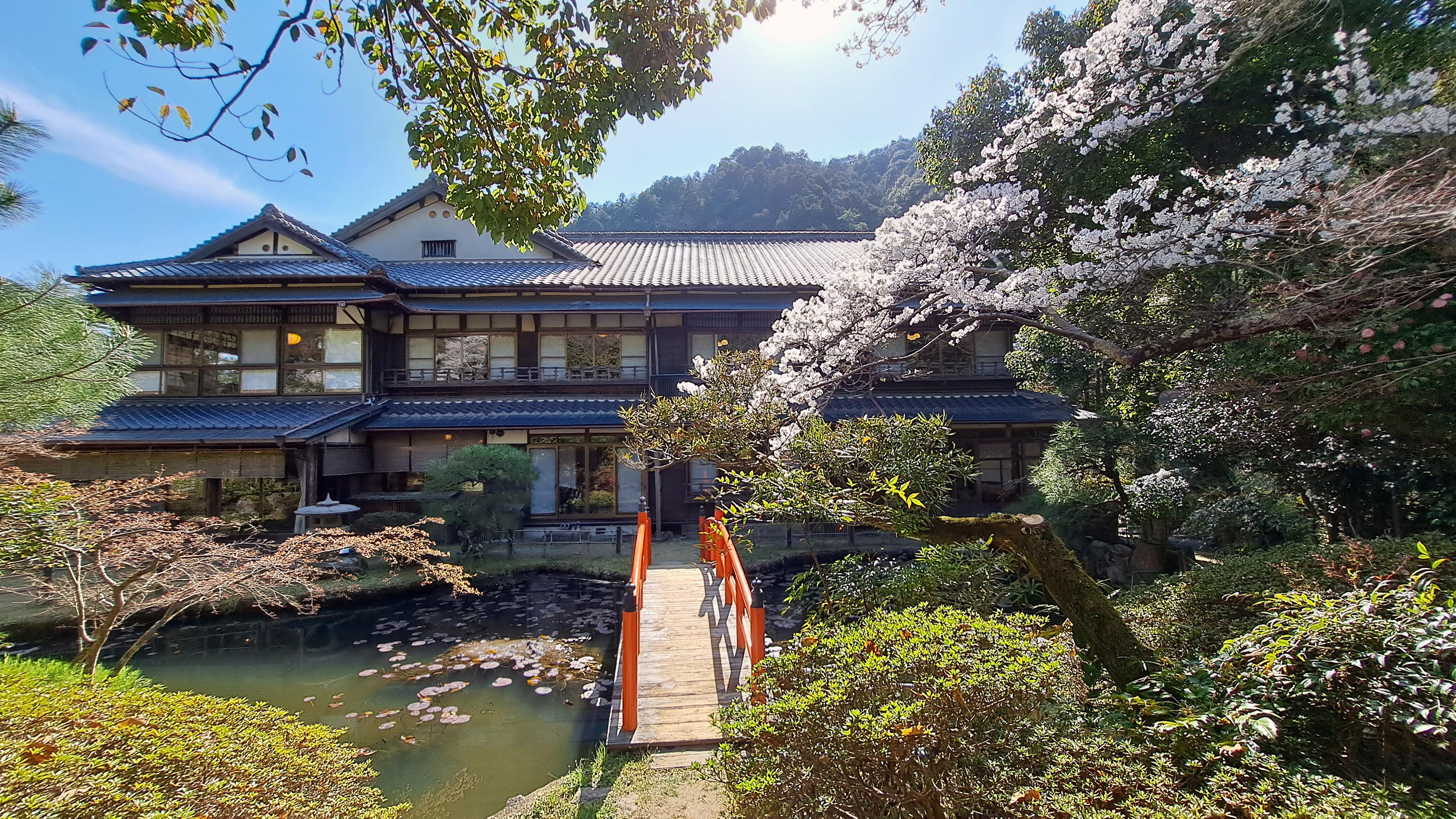
Amami Onsen Nanten-en in Kawachinagano, southern Osaka

== Relatives ==
- Wife: Hisako Tatsuno (辰野久子) was a grandchild of Egawa Hidetatsu, an intendant of Tokugawa shogunate.
- First son: Yutaka Tatsuno (辰野隆) was a scholar of French literature and writer.
- Second son: Tamotsu Tatsuno (辰野保) was known as an athlete of athletics in his younger days. He graduated from Tokyo Imperial University and became a lawyer. He was a politician of Rikken Seiyūkai.

== Bibliography ==
- Dallas Finn, Meiji Revisited: The Sites of Victorian Japan, Weatherhill, 1995 ISBN 978-0-8348-0288-9
- Louis Frédéric (translated by Käthe Roth), Japan Encyclopedia, 1996 (2002), ISBN 0-674-00770-0
- Stewart, David B (2002). The Making of a Modern Japanese Architecture, From the Founders to Shinohara and Isozaki. Kodansha International.
- Reynolds, Jonathan M. (2001). Maekawa Kunio and the Emergence of Japanese Modernist Architecture. University of California Press. ISBN 0-520-21495-1.
- Ruxton, Ian, 'Tatsuno Kingo (1854-1919): 'A Leading Architect' of the Meiji Era', Chapter 33, pp. 443–455 in Britain and Japan: Biographical Portraits, Volume VII, Folkestone: Global Oriental, 2010
